= List of computer-aided manufacturing software =

This is a list of computer-aided manufacturing (CAM) software.

List of computer-aided manufacturing (CAM) software
| Software | Developer | Operating system |
|---|---|---|
| Alibre MeshCAM | Alibre | Windows |
| AutoCAD CAM | Autodesk | Windows, macOS |
| Autodesk Fusion | Autodesk | Windows, macOS, Web, Android, iOS |
| Autodesk Inventor CAM | Autodesk | Windows |
| Blender CAM | Blender | Linux, macOS, Windows, Haiku |
| BricsCAD | Bricsys | Windows, macOS, Linux |
| Cadwork | Cadwork informatik AG | Windows |
| CAMWorks | Dassault Systèmes | Windows |
| Carbide Create | Carbide 3D | Windows, macOS |
| CATIA | Dassault Systèmes | Windows |
| Cimatron | Cimatron Ltd. | Windows |
| Creo Parametric | PTC | Windows |
| Creo CADDS 5 | PTC | Windows |
| Delcam | Autodesk | Windows |
| DELMIA | Dassault Systèmes | Windows, Linux |
| Edgecam | Vero Software | Windows |
| ENCY | ENCY Software | Windows |
| EXAPT | EXAPT Systemtechnik GmbH | Windows |
| FORAN System | Siemens Digital Industries Software | Windows, Linux |
| FreeCAD; Path Workbench | Open source | Linux, macOS, Windows |
| GrblGru | toe@home | Windows, Linux (Wine) |
| Kiri:Moto | Stewart Allen | Windows, macOS, Linux, Web |
| LinuxCNC | Linux Foundation | Debian Linux |
| Mastercam | CNC Software, LLC | Windows |
| MazaCAM | Yamazaki Mazak | Windows |
| NC-CAM | NC-CAM, Inc. | Windows |
| NCSIMUL 4CAM | SPRING Technologies | Windows |
| NESTIX | Hexagon AB | Windows |
| Onshape | PTC | Linux, macOS, Windows |
| Open CASCADE Technology | Open Cascade | Windows, Linux, macOS |
| OpenBuilds CAM | OpenBuilds | Windows, macOS, Linux |
| PowerMILL | Autodesk | Windows |
| RhinoCAM | Plugin for Rhino from MecSoft Corporation | Windows, macOS |
| Siemens NX | Siemens Digital Industries Software | Windows, macOS, Unix |
| SmartCAM | SmartCAMcnc | Windows |
| SolidCAM | SolidCAM Ltd. | Windows |
| Solid Edge | Siemens Digital Industries Software | Windows |
| SprutCAM | SprutCAM Tech Ltd. | Windows |
| Surfcam | Surfware | Windows |
| Tebis | Tebis Technische Informationssysteme AG | Windows, HP-UX |
| TopSolid | Missler Software | Windows |
| Vericut | CGTech Inc. | Windows |
| Visi CAD/CAM | Hexagon AB | Windows |
| VisualCAD/CAM | MecSoft Corporation | Windows |
| VoluMill | Celeritive Technologies | Windows |
| WorkNC | Sescoi | Windows |
| ZW3D | ZWSOFT | Windows |

- Proprietary
- Open source

== See also ==
- APT (programming language)
- CNC machining
- Computer-aided manufacturing
- Comparison of computer-aided design software
- G-code
- List of 3D modeling software
- List of 3D computer graphics software
- List of 3D printing software
- List of BIM software
- List of computer-aided engineering software
