= EXAPT =

Programming language

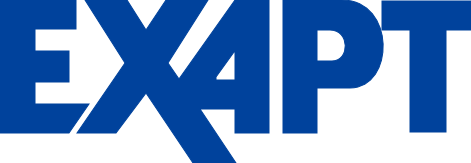
EXAPT-Logo

EXAPT (a portmanteau of "Extended Subset of APT") is a production-oriented programming language that allows users to generate NC programs with control information for machining tools and facilitates decision-making for production-related issues that may arise during various machining processes.

EXAPT was first developed to address industrial requirements. Through the years, the company created additional software for the manufacturing industry. Today, EXAPT offers a suite of SAAS products and services for the manufacturing industry.

The trade name, EXAPT, is most commonly associated with the CAD/CAM-System, production data, and tool management software of the German company EXAPT Systemtechnik GmbH based in Aachen, DE.

== General ==
EXAPT is a modularly built programming system for all NC machining operations as

- Drilling
- Turning
- Milling
- Turn-Milling
- Nibbling
- Flame-, laser-, plasma- and water jet cutting
- Wire eroding
- Operations with industrial robots

Due to the modular structure, the main product groups, EXAPTcam and EXAPTpdo, are gradually expandable and permit individual software for the manufacturing industry used individually and also in a compound with an existing IT environment.

== Functionality ==
EXAPTcam meets the requirements for NC planning, especially for the cutting operations such as turning, drilling, and milling up to 5-axis simultaneous machining. Thereby new process technologies, tool, and machine concepts are constantly involved. In the NC programming data from different sources such as 3D CAD models, drawings or tables can flow in. The possibilities of NC programming reaches from language-oriented to feature-oriented NC programming. The integrated EXAPT knowledge database and intelligent and scalable automatisms support the user. The EXAPT NC planning also covers the generation of production information as clamping and tool plans, presetting data or time calculations. The realistic simulation possibilities of NC planning and NC control data provide with production reliability.

EXAPTpdo (EXAPT ProductionsDataOrganization) provides a neutrally applicable technology platform for the information compound of the NC planning - to the shop floor. This applies to all NC production data that are necessary for the set-up of NC machines, for the provision, presetting, and stocking of manufacturing resources and provided by EXAPTpdo in a central database. Besides classical functions of the tool management system (TMS) as the management of cutting tools, measuring, testing and clamping devices the technology data management and tool lifecycle management (TLM) is also included. System-supported "where-used lists" helps to handle the manufacturing resource cycle by secured requirement determination and requirement fulfillment. Unnecessary transports and unplanned dispositive adjustments are dropped, stocks are reduced, set-up times reduced and the throughput is increased. EXAPTpdo synchronizes involved systems within the value chain. Stock systems, MES systems or ERP systems (e.g. from the purchasing or production areas) do not work in isolation from each other but they interact with each other. EXAPTpdo provides the base to Smart Factory, for more flexibility in production and faster communication.

== History ==
With the foundation of the EXAPT-Verein in 1967 as spin-off of the universities Aachen, Berlin and Stuttgart the further development "EXAPT (EXtended Subset of APT)" of the programming language "APT (Automatically Programmed Tool)" was focused and so the first milestone for the EXAPT history was set. In the same year the system EXAPT 1 for drilling and simple milling tasks became available.

1969 The industrial application of EXAPT 2 for the programming of NC machines with 2-axis linear and path control begins. In the following year, the development of the EXAPT modular system starts.

1972 BASIC-EXAPT is provided for the universal, homogeneous programming of all NC tasks. The support is made by the EXAPT applications consultancy.

1973 EXAPT 1.1 is provided for the programming of straight-cut and continuous-path controlled drilling and milling machines and machining centers. At the Hanover Fair (IHA 73) the interactive access to a mainframe via a time-sharing terminal for the part program entry and correction is presented and starts the replacement of the punch card.

1974 The possibilities for the use of process computers for the NC data transfer are leveled out. EXAPT offers the possibility of the result simulation when using plotters with display of tool paths and tools in assignment to the workpiece.

In April 1975, the EXAPT NC Systemtechnik GmbH was founded with the aim, of enabling entry into the NC technique for small and medium-sized companies by a complete product and service program. In the following year, the system portfolio is extended with further system modules and service programs and the provision of postprocessors.

1978 The development activities on the EXAPT module system started in 1970 are completed. Using modern software techniques, the different system parts BASIC-EXAPT, EXAPT 1, EXAPT 1.1, and EXAPT 2 are composed of a total system. System support and applications consultancy become a new working focus.

From the beginning to the middle of the 1980s Beside new portable software modules for CAD/CAM applications (e. g. CAPEX, NESTEX, CADEX, CADCPL), the first version of the EXAPT DNC system and extensions of the EXAPT NC programming system for the machining of sculptured surfaces are presented.

1988 EXAPT expands the software product range by systems for tool data management (BMO) and production data management (FDO). EXAPT trains more than 1,300 course participants including company-specific courses.

1992 The first version of the completely new product generation EXAPTplus is presented and the agency in Dresden is opened.

1993 The company name "EXAPT NC Systemtechnik GmbH" is changed to "EXAPT Systemtechnik GmbH." EXAPTplus is presented on PC under Windows NT at the EMO '93. The decentralization of the use of EXAPT systems expands the range of applications. In the following year, EXAPT-DNC is executable under Windows on a customary PC. Special hardware is not needed and so it can be used in compound with the database-supported EXAPT production data management system (FDO).

1995 EXAPTplus is also ready for complex application cases such as machining of tubes at extrusion tools. EXAPT-CADI provides the transfer of 2D CAD data to EXAPTplus. With the new office Gießen the marketing is strengthened. In the following year the EXAPT NC editor is developed for the direct processing of NC control data with tool path display and visualization of the tools.

In the course of the market entry of more comfortable 3D CAD systems for the solid modelling of components a detailed evaluation of current systems is made in 1997. It is decided to use SolidWorks as a reference system for the solid-oriented NC planning with EXAPT.

1998 The first solution for the transfer of geometry data between SolidWorks and EXAPTplus is generated. The EXAPT organization systems are (beside SQL) also executable under Oracle now. The use of client server solutions supports the data flow in the production.

1999 AFR functions are provided in connection with EXAPTsolid to support a workpiece modelling for NC. The millennium capability is ensured for all EXAPT systems. AFR is a ground-breaking for the integration of third-party products.

2002 EXAPT-BMG is developed for the generation and visualization of tools with additional functions for the assembly from components. The acquisition of tools with their geometric and technological presentation offers extensive support of the NC planning with EXAPT systems.

2003 EXAPTpdo is available to optimize the process chains in production planning and production execution optimally regarding the increasing requirements of changing production conditions.

2004 Diverse system extensions are made in EXAPTplus, EXAPTsolid, EXAPT NC editor, EXAPTpdo for the complete machining on turning/milling centres with result reliability because of more extensive simulation based on realNC (Tecnomatix), for the use of new complex tool systems and the compound use between ERP systems as SAP and intelligent CNC systems. In the following year, EXAPTpdo is extended for the cross-order set-up optimization and provision of manufacturing re-sources especially for single and small series production with connection to purchase and physical portfolio management.

2006 The EXAPT systems are available for extended use as an information platform for production, the time management, and similar requirements. EXAPTsolid is extended for the feature-oriented milling operation and machine simulation. The NC programming of complex machine tools, e.g. three-turret-turning/milling centers is supported by EXAPT systems, as well as the use of multi-functional tools.

2007 A module for 3-5-axis simultaneous milling machining is presented.
