= Vericut =

VERICUT
- CGTech, developer of Vericut software

- Screenshot of Vericut Version 7.3
- Developer: CGTech Inc.
- Stable release: VERICUT 9.6 / 2025
- Website: www.cgtech.com

Vericut (publicly capitalized VERICUT), is a software program used for simulating CNC machining. It is used to simulate tool motion and the material removal process, detecting errors or areas of inefficiency in NC programs. It was developed by CGTech Inc. and first released in 1988.

== History ==
Vericut was designed by CGTech Inc. in 1988. The software was first developed to run in Unix workstations and was later ported to Windows. Since its initial launch, Vericut has been installed and is used by Fortune 500 and other notable companies including Boeing, Airbus, General Motors, and Israel Aircraft Industries As of 2009, Vericut has been used by more than 2000 companies worldwide. In 2011, CGTech was ranked as the largest independent NC verification and simulation software provider based on revenue, with over 9,000 installed seats.

== Features ==
Vericut is standalone software but also integrates with CAD, CAM, and PLM systems including CATIA, Siemens NX, PowerMILL, EdgeCAM, Mastercam and Hypermill. It uses a three-axis through five-axis simulation motion to simulate milling and drilling operations. The simulation is displayed on a graphics screen as a solid 3D model of the raw stock, simulating the programmed cutting motions and then displaying the finished part.

=== Machine tool simulation ===
Vericut software is customizable and includes a selection of machine tools. Machine models can also be built from scratch, using a CAD system or by defining such in the software. It contains a component tree to manage the kinematics of a machine. Vericut simulates machine tools in their entirety as they would appear in a shop and shows the removal of material at the workpiece level. It also simulates NC machine controls and automatically checks for collisions and over travel of machine tools to reduce the probability of a machine crash.

The machine simulation feature detects all machine components for near-misses and collisions. Near miss zones can be set up by users around components to check for close calls and over-travel errors. Machine movements are simulated in review mode while stepping or playing backwards.

=== NC program optimization ===
Vericut has NC program optimizing capabilities. It automatically determines the safe feed rate for each cut based on programmed feed rates, reducing cycling time. The optimization is said to reduce the amount of scrapped parts, broken tools, and cutter deflection.

== See also ==
- Machine tool
- Tool wear
- List of computer-aided manufacturing software
