= WorkXPlore 3D =

PartXplore
- Original author(s): Vero Software
- Initial release: 2008
- Operating system: Windows
- Available in: 10 languages
- List of languages English, French, German, Spanish, Portuguese, Italian, Czech, Japanese, Chinese, Korean
- Type: CAD file viewer
- Website: www.partxplore.com

PartXplore is a computer-aided design (CAD) file viewer developed by Sescoi for reading, analysing, and sharing 3D and 2D CAD files. It was introduced in 2008 and is supported by local Vero offices. The software is available as a viewer and an evaluation version.

== Functionality ==
PartXplore serves as a collaborative viewer for 2D and 3D CAD files, allowing users to measure 3D parts and analyze various properties such as undercut areas, plane surfaces, thickness, volumes, surfaces, and weight. The software also provides dynamic cross-sectional visualization.

PartXplore enables users to add dimensional and geometric measurements, annotations, and labels directly to the 3D model. Additionally, the software facilitates the sharing of 3D parts and assembly files through a standalone application that can be transmitted as an executable file. The recipient can then access and work on the 3D model received.

== CAD formats supported ==
PartXplore is compatible with various file types, including:

- 2D formats: DXF, DWG, WorkNC 2D curves, CATIA V5 2D, UG 2D, Pro/E 2D and HPGL
- 3D formats: STL (Stereo-lithography), IGES (Initial Graphics Exchange Specifications - igs, iges), STEP (STandard for the Exchange of Product model data - stp, step), WorkNC 3D (wnc), UGS Parasolid (x_t, xmt_txt, x_b), SolidWorks (Parts, assemblies, drawings & sheet metal -sldprt, sldasm, slddrw), PTC Pro/ENGINEER (prt, asm), CATIA V4 (model, exp, user-def), CATIA V5 (catpart, catproduct, cgr), UGS Unigraphics 3D (prt, asm), CADDS, SolidEdge (prt, asm), ACIS and UNISURF
- NC formats: ISO G-code, WorkNC files.

== See also ==
- WorkNC
- WorkPLAN
