= Alcove (landform) =

Geographical term

Alcove is the geographical and geological term for a steep-sided hollow in the side of an exposed rock face or cliff of a homogeneous rock type, that was water eroded. They are created through weathering, erosion, dry granular flow, and stress. Another factor in the formation of alcoves is winds between mid to late summer that steepen at the edge which leads to the failure and shaping of sand deposition in certain areas.

== Locations on Earth ==
=== North Pole ===
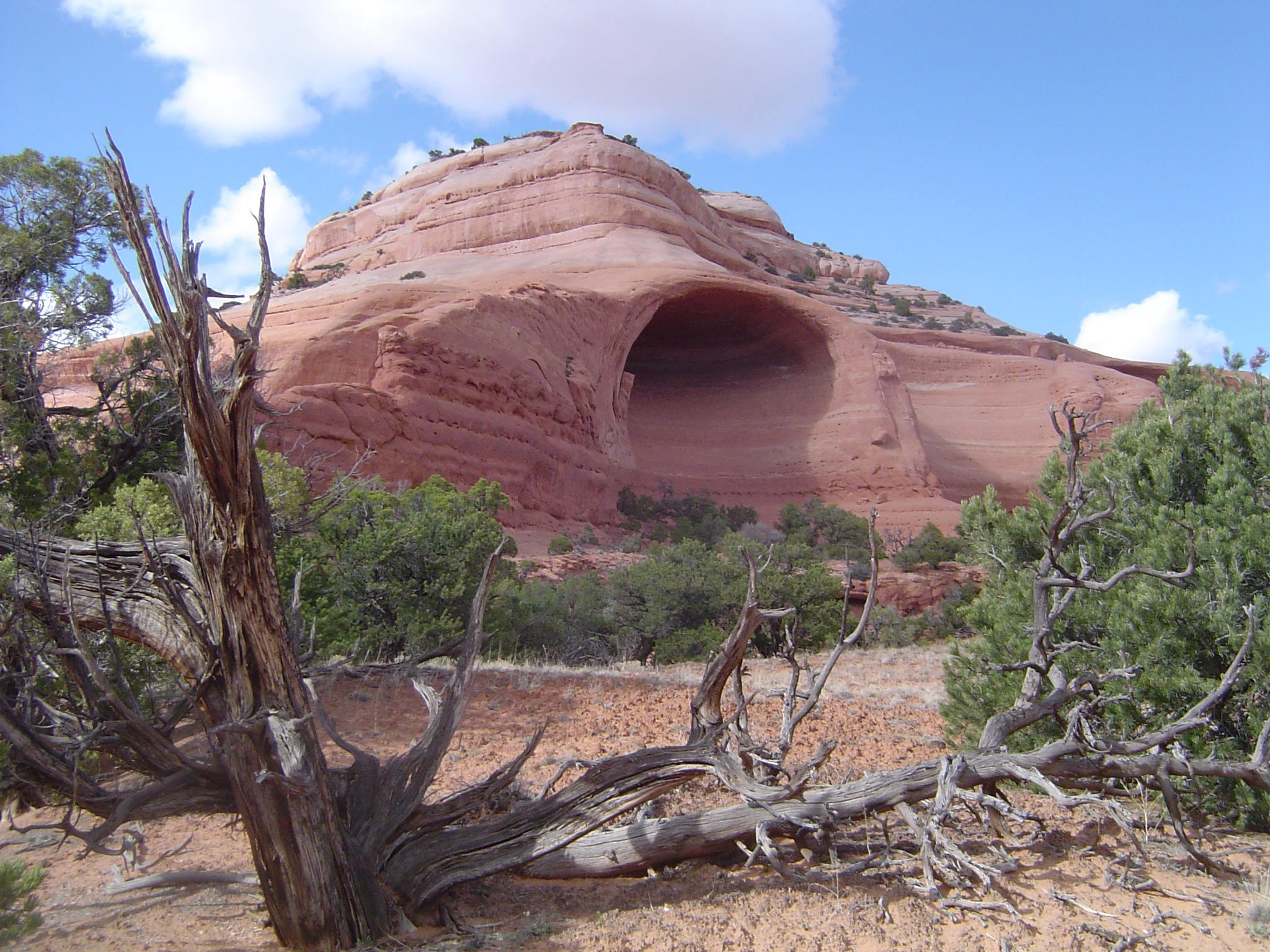
An alcove in Entrada Sandstone near Moab, Utah

Although alcoves are both found in the northern and southern hemisphere, more newly developed alcoves are in the northern hemisphere region. Around the North Pole, dune alcoves, dune furrows, and scarp avalanches can form. The mechanism dune furrows are formed are through cryo jets and many form at alluvial fans. Furrows are channels and although mostly small they can vary in size and everytime they form in the spring season. Furrows do not have a long lifetime as they are often blown away by strong summer winds.

=== South Pole ===
In comparison, the South Pole differs in having higher elevation which can cause changes in alcove formation. These differences include the South Pole having older alcoves due to its denser deposition craters which are approximately 2 to 3 m thick which include particles of ice and minerals, and craters that contains carbon dioxide ice. Both South Pole and North Pole alcoves are formed through stress cementing the sandstone particles together. So after erosion, at the area where the most rock has been excavated by weathering the pressure builds up and the sand particles become very stable and hold the arch above.

== Locations on Other Planetary Bodies ==
=== Mars ===
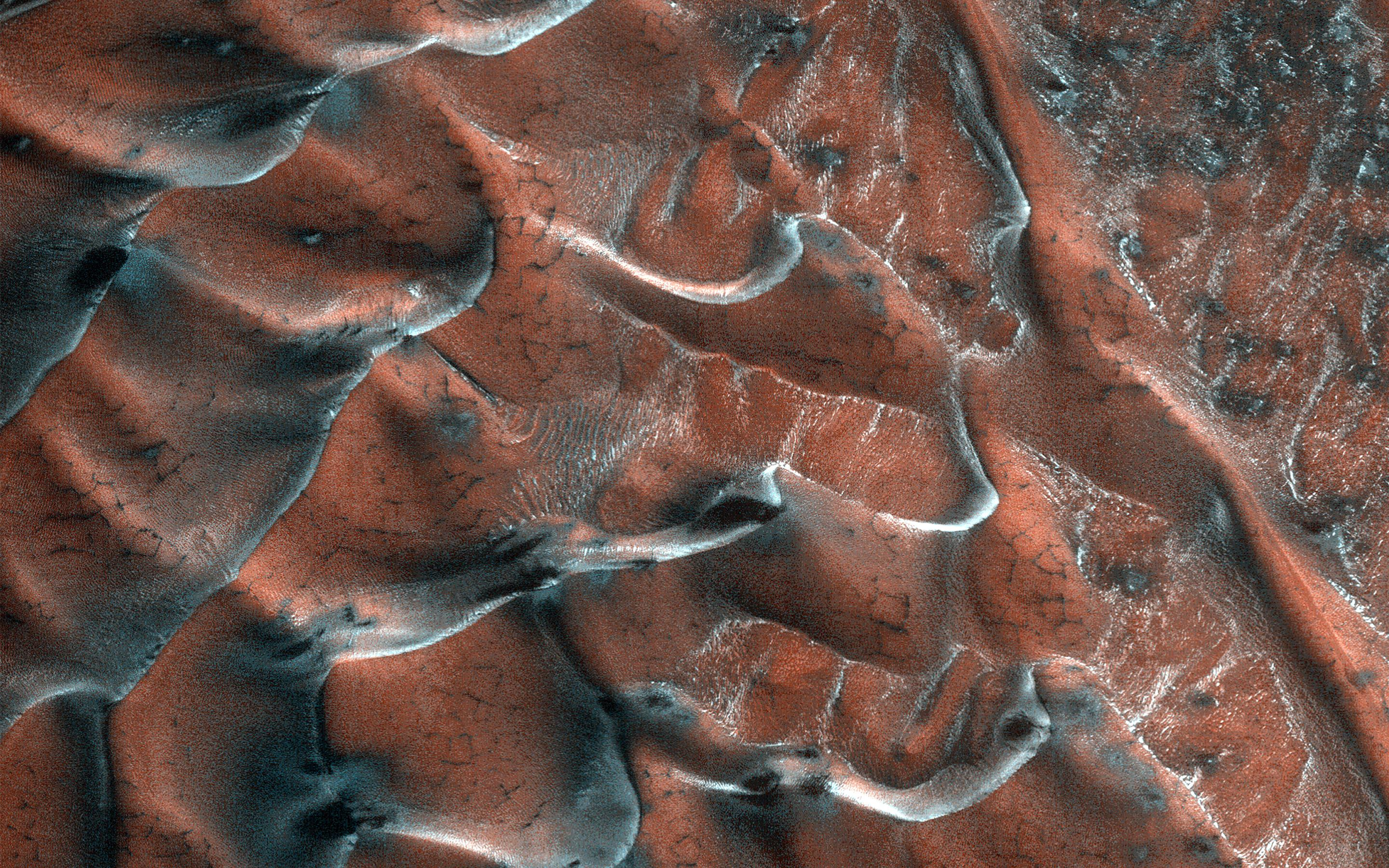
Alcoves with Alluvial Fans on Surface of Mars

Annually in the North Pole region, alcove formation is most active during autumn and winter seasons and also form specific alcove-apron regions during springtime sublimation. This is when the alcoves start at the edge of dunes and deposit and end into an apron fan shape. During summertime on Mars, strong winds will blow away smaller less stable alcoves which starts the cycle for new alcoves to form the following autumn and winter. It is estimated that alcove formation is responsible for a range of 2 to 20% of sand movement on Mars.
