= WorkPLAN =

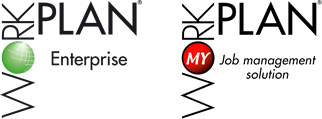
- Initial release: 1992
- Stable release: Version 3
- Preview release: Version 4
- Written in: PowerBuilder, Delphi and C++
- Operating system: Windows 7, Vista, XP, 2003, 2000 Server, 2000 Advanced Server, 2003 Server & 2008 Server
- Available in: English, French, German, Spanish, Portuguese, Italian, Dutch, Turkish, Russian, Czech, Japanese, Chinese, Korean, Polish
- Type: ERP
- Website: www.workplan.com

WorkPLAN is a range of enterprise resource planning (ERP) software products (WorkPLAN Enterprise and MyWorkPLAN) developed by Sescoi for custom manufacturers or departments who work project-based and need specialized ERP software for project management.

The typical users of this ERP software are from the following industries: mold and die manufacturing, engineering, tooling, automotive, aerospace and defense.

== History ==
The first version of the WorkPLAN ERP software was launched by Sescoi in 1992. Version 12, released in 2006, is the last version of this first system.

Sescoi started development of a new generation of WorkPLAN ERP from 2003, which it launched as two complementary products. The first of these is MyWorkPLAN, a modular ERP for project management, launched in 2006. The second one is WorkPLAN Enterprise, a full ERP software for custom manufacturers, mold and die makers and engineering departments, launched in 2008. These two products use MySQL as a database engine, and they include a redesigned user interface with a navigation tree similar to the one used in CAD systems.

Version 3 of MyWorkPLAN and WorkPLAN Enterprise was released in 2009.

Both products are an officially SAP Certified Solution since 25 November of year 2009. MyWorkPLAN and WorkPLAN Enterprise can receive jobs or task lists from the SAP ERP or other ERP systems, detailing parts and quantities of components to be produced. WorkPLAN then manages the manufacturing process, including the production planning and scheduling, production performance monitoring, and recording the time spent on each task by each employee or machine in real time, using touchscreens, barcode readers or data-entry forms. As production proceeds, data can be fed back into SAP in the form of time taken, events completed and parts produced. Detail such as set-up times, processing times, teardown times, quantities completed, reworked or scrapped can be included in the information flow. Real-time recording of this information in WorkPLAN helps keep the SAP system up to date, producing a dynamic exchange of data, and safeguards the business information, so when it is presented to managers, it reflects the true and current status of manufacture. Companies using SAP solutions at a corporate level can benefit from this integration, which enables to optimise the performance of specialised areas within the organization, such as engineering departments or manufacturing units of moulds, dies or prototypes.

Version 4 was launched at the Euromold show held at the Frankfurt Trade Fair in December 2010. This version includes new tools for customer relationship management (CRM) and a combination of detailed and simplified planning methods. It also includes an updated user interface, a new web enabled access to the system and new functions to manage batch production.

== Functionality ==
WorkPLAN ERP products allow companies or departments to automate and manage the most important activities such as project costs, quotations, orders, planning, document management, analysis of 3D CAD files, bills of materials, quality, touch screen to control time and attendance and to record time spent on tasks, purchasing, stock management, key performance indicators, management overview and strategic analysis.

== Technology ==
The first version of the WorkPLAN ERP was programmed using Unify VISION language, and with Unify DataServer as a database engine from Unify Corporation.

The two new products, MyWorkPLAN and WorkPLAN Enterprise, have been programmed using PowerBuilder, Delphi and C++, and they use MySQL as a database engine. Both products incorporate technology from US company Tom Sawyer Software, for the graphical creation and visualization of links between tasks.

== Interfaces with other systems ==
WorkPLAN Enterprise and MyWorkPLAN have interfaces with the following types of software:

- MS Office, MS Project and Open Office
- Accounting systems (Sage, QuickBooks, Datev, Cegid, EBP, Varial, etc.)
- Payroll systems
- Other ERP products (SAP, Navision, etc.)
- CAM Software (WorkNC)
- CAD and PLM software to import Bills of Materials (VisiCAD, Think3, TopSolid, AutoCAD, Cimatron, ProEngineer, Unigraphics, etc.)
- CAD/CAM software, for analysing CAD files (STEP, IGES, CATIA V4 & V5, Unigraphics, SolidWorks, SolidEdge, Pro/E, Parasolid, STL, etc.) with the option of using WorkXPlore 3D
- Advanced planning and scheduling systems (Ortems and Preactor)
- CRM software (Sage Vente Partner, etc.)
- Shop Floor Data Collection systems
- Manufacturing systems, through the XML agent
