= Sescoi =

- Type: Private
- Industry: Software for automotive, aerospace and defense, engineering, general mechanical, medical and dental, tooling, mold and die industries
- Founded: 1987
- Headquarters: Mâcon, France
- Area served: Worldwide
- Products: WorkNC CAD/CAM, WorkPLAN ERP solutions with WorkPLAN Enterprise and MyWorkPLAN, WorkXPlore 3D, WorkNC Dental
- Services: Technical support, installation, training and consulting.
- Divisions: CAD/CAM Software, ERP Management Software
- Subsidiaries: UK, USA, France, Germany, Spain, Japan, China, Korea, India
- Website: www.sescoi.com

Sescoi is a developer of industrial software for computer-aided manufacturing, enterprise resource planning and extended enterprise productivity. Its WorkNC software is one of the market leaders in the CAD/CAM field and is used by more than 25% of companies in demanding countries such as Japan. Sescoi also develops WorkPLAN, a range of ERP software products for custom manufacturers and project based companies. As of 2011 Sescoi had more than 5000 customers and 11000 licenses sold worldwide. Sescoi and its products were acquired by Vero Software in January 2013.

== History ==
Sescoi was created by Bruno Marko in 1987. The company name comes from the French acronym "Société Européenne Spécialisée en Communication Organisation et Informatique". Sescoi was an early pioneer in the development of 3D CAM software with the launch of WorkNC in 1988. WorkNC is well known for its focus on automation and ease of use.

In 1992 the company launched WorkPLAN, its first ERP software for custom manufacturing and project management.

Sescoi acquired Xitron in 2001 and Mecasoft Industrie, developer of the Solid Concept, a 3D parametric MCAD software, in 2002.

The company launched WorkNC-CAD in 2002, WorkNC 5-axis in 2003 and WorkNC G3 in 2007.

A new generation of WorkPLAN ERP was developed and launched as two complementary products. The first one is MyWorkPLAN, a modular ERP for project management, launched in 2006. The second is WorkPLAN Enterprise, a full ERP software for custom manufacturers, mold and die makers and engineering departments, launched in 2008. Both of these products use MySQL as a database engine, and feature a redesigned user interface, with a navigation tree similar to that used in CAD systems.

In 2008 Sescoi launched WorkXPlore 3D, a high-speed collaborative viewer for analyzing and sharing 3D CAD files without requiring the original CAD application.

In year 2009 Sescoi launched WorkNC Dental, CAD/CAM software for automatic machining of prosthetic appliances, implants or dental structures, and also launched WorkNC Wire EDM, a software for wire EDM.

As of 2011, Sescoi had offices in the US, UK, France, Germany, Spain, Japan, India, China and Korea, and more than 50 distributors around the world serving customers in industries such as Automotive, Aerospace and Defense, Engineering, General Mechanical, Medical & Dental, Tooling and Mold & Die.

Sescoi was acquired by the Vero Software Group in January 2013.

== Main products ==
WorkNC - Automatic CAD/CAM software for machining complex parts from 2 to 5 axis.
WorkPLAN Enterprise - Custom manufacturing ERP software
MyWorkPLAN - Project management ERP software
WorkXPlore 3D - High-speed collaborative viewer for analyzing and sharing 3D CAD files
WorkNC Dental - CAD/CAM software for automatic machining of prosthetic appliances, implants or dental structures

== Sponsorship activity ==
Sescoi was involved in sport sponsorship, and was primarily known for having sponsored the Formula 1 team Prost Grand Prix in 1999 and 2000 as well as the German racing driver Catharina Felser.

Sescoi sponsored and worked with Eric Barone, a French sportsman, well known for having beaten the world speed record descending on a bicycle. His record on snow is 222 km/h achieved at Les Arcs, while on soil it is 172 km/h, achieved at the Cerro Negro volcano.
