= Cimatron =

Israeli software company

- Company type: Private
- Traded as: Nasdaq: CIMT
- Industry: Computer-aided design, computer-aided manufacturing
- Founded: 1982; 44 years ago
- Headquarters: Stockholm, Sweden
- Area served: Worldwide
- Products: Engineering software
- Services: Maintenance
- Website: cimatron.com

Cimatron is a Swedish software company that produces computer-aided design and computer-aided manufacturing (CAD/CAM) software for manufacturing, toolmaking and computer numerical control (CNC) programming applications.

The company was listed on the Nasdaq exchange under the symbol CIMT, until its 2014 acquisition by 3D Systems. On November 2, 2020 Battery Ventures, a global, technology-focused investment firm, has agreed to acquire the combined Cimatron and GibbsCAM software businesses from global additive manufacturing solutions company 3D Systems Corporation (NYSE: DDD). As part of the acquisition, Cimatron and GibbsCAM joined Battery-backed SigmaTEK Systems, a CAD/CAM software provider serving professional fabricators, in a new holding company called CAMBRIO. On October 18, 2021, Sandvik acquired US-based Cambrio, a leading company with a portfolio in CAD/CAM software for manufacturing industries like automotive, transportation, energy, medical, and aerospace.

Headquartered in Stockholm, the firm has subsidiaries in the United States, Germany, Italy, China, South Korea, India and Brazil, and resellers in over 40 countries. Its main software products, CimatronE and GibbsCAM, are used in over 50,000 installations worldwide. Its clients are largely from the automotive, aerospace, consumer electronics, toys, medical, optics and telecom industries.

== History ==
The firm was founded in 1982 as MicroCAD, releasing its first software products Multicadd and Multicam in 1984 for use by small- to medium-sized tool shops. In 1987, the firm changed its name to Cimatron.

In 1990, the firm launched Cimatron IT, which it claimed was the world's first integrated CAD/CAM software.

In March 1996, Cimatron began trading on the Nasdaq under the symbol CIMT. In 1999, Cimatron launched its product for Windows, CimatronE. In March 2011, Cimatron began trading on the Tel-Aviv Stock Exchange, becoming a dual-listed company. However, in 2013 its board of directors voted to delist from the TASE.

In July 2005, Cimatron acquired an initial 27.5% interest in Microsystem Srl, its Italian distributor. By July 2008, Cimatron had completed the acquisition of 100% of Microsystem.

In January 2008, Cimatron merged with US CNC machining software company Gibbs and Associates. Former Gibbs head William Gibbs assumed the position of Cimatron President North America and Vice Chairman of Cimatron Ltd. and agreed to remain with the firm for at least five years.

In 2010, Cimatron was listed by product lifecycle management (PLM) consulting firm CIMdata as one of the leading suppliers of CAM software based on CAM software and services direct revenue received. CIMdata also predicted that Cimatron would be one of the five most rapidly growing CAM software companies in 2011.

In the 4th quarter of 2010, Cimatron reported its highest ever quarterly revenue of $11 million and operating profit of $1.7 million. Also Cimatron and LEDAS (LGS 3D owner those days) have collaborated on Motion Simulation application dedicated to mold, tool and die maker design, that is able to work with standard CAD shapes, i.e., canonics and NURBS. Collision detection was based on functions of ACIS + CGM kernel, while motion was performed by LGS 3D as a sequence of constraint satisfaction problems.

In 2011, the firm was listed as one of Israel's fastest growing technology companies in the Deloitte Fast 50 Awards' list.

For 2012 Cimatron reported revenues of $42.3 million, with a record non-GAAP operating profit of $6.1 million.

In February 2013, Cimatron CEO Danny Haran announced that the firm had begun researching the additive manufacturing field. In March of that year Cimatron established a 3D Printing Advisory board, naming 3D printing expert Terry Wohlers as its first member.

In 2015, 3D Systems completed its acquisition of all shares of Cimatron Ltd. for approximately $97 million.

On November 2, 2020 Battery Ventures, a global, technology-focused investment firm, has agreed to acquire the combined Cimatron and GibbsCAM software businesses from global additive manufacturing solutions company 3D Systems Corporation (NYSE: DDD). As part of the acquisition, Cimatron and GibbsCAM joined Battery-backed SigmaTEK Systems, a CAD/CAM software provider serving professional fabricators, in a new holding company called CAMBRIO.

On October 18, 2021, Sandvik acquired US-based Cambrio, a leading company with a portfolio in CAD/CAM software for manufacturing industries like automotive, transportation, energy, medical, and aerospace

== Products ==
=== CimatronE ===
CimatronE is an integrated CAD/CAM system for mold, die, and tool makers and manufacturers of discrete parts, providing associativity across the manufacturing process from quoting, through design and delivery. The system's products include mold design, electrode design, die design, 2.5 to 5-axis numerical control (NC) programming and 5-axis discrete part production. In 2025, Cimatron introduced Artificial intelligence into CimatronE as a module called CAD-AI https://www.cimatron.com/en/cimatron-cad-ai for machining feature detection. Also in 2025, Cimatron released a new product called DieQuote https://www.cimatron.com/en/cimatron-diequote.

=== Cimatron DieQuote ===
Cimatron DieQuote is a cloud-based software solution that powers the creation of comprehensive stamping die cost estimates in as little as ten minutes. Using intelligent algorithms and customizable design parameters, the solution helps tool and die manufacturers improve productivity and competitiveness by ensuring that estimates reflect the multiple factors that influence how stamping dies are developed and produced.

== See also ==
- List of computer-aided manufacturing software
