= CryoJet =

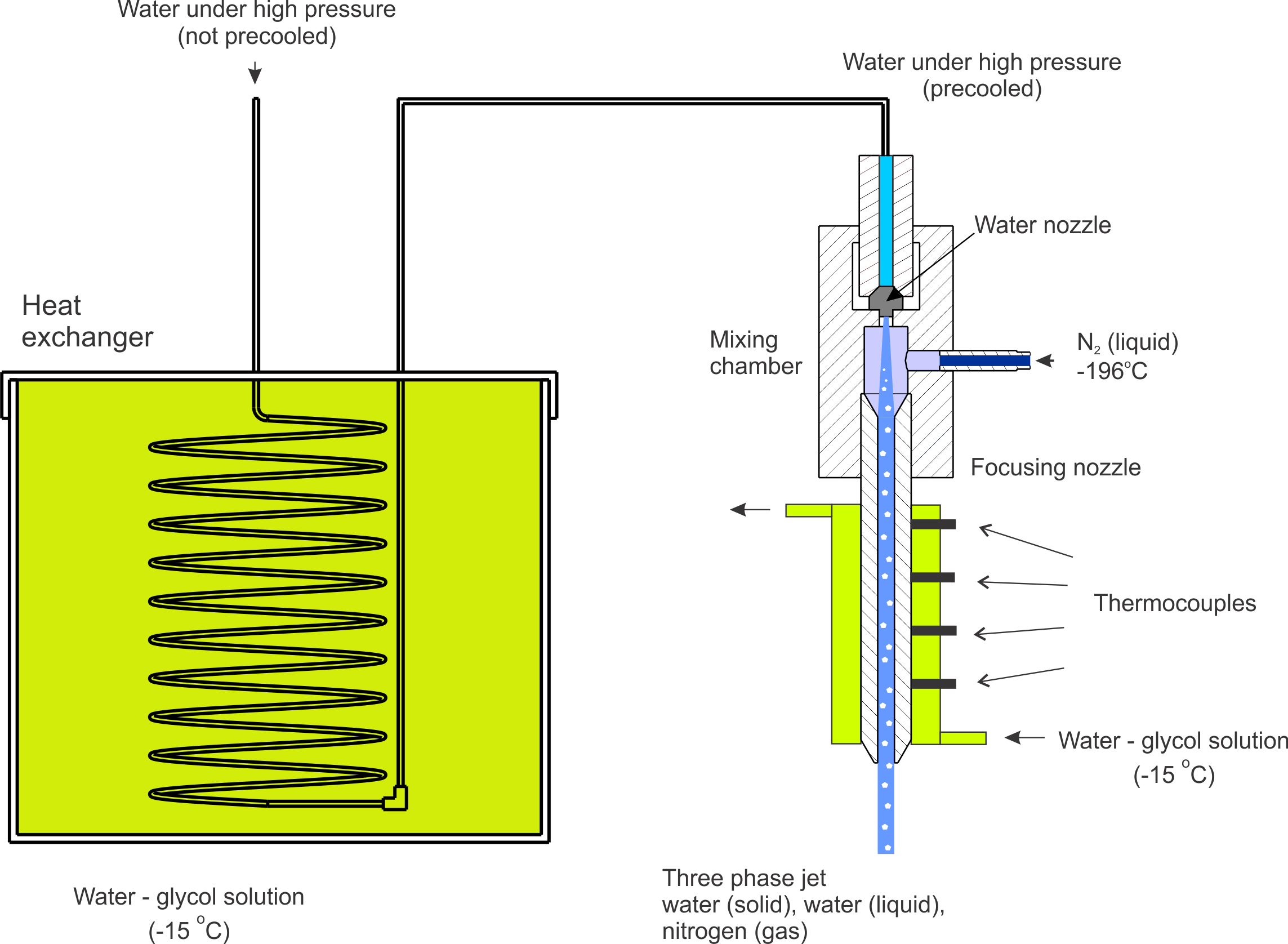
IceJet system with sub-cooled pressurised water

CryoJet / IceJet is a derivative of the machining process called abrasive waterjet (AWJ) machining. CryoJet/IceJet technology uses ice particles made of water coming from a running water or freshwater system to cut material. While the ice particles are cutting material, they melt and go into the water tank of the machine. The pressurized water acting as a cutting jet can be re-used, with adequate filtering, creating a closed water circuit. However, the majority of users do not re-use the water. If more widely used, CryoJet may produce a drastic reduction in the amount of abrasive waste spill currently produced during the water jet cutting process, as no mineral abrasive is used by this technology.

== Ice Generation ==
There are two different approaches to ice particles generation.

- The ice particles can be prepared beforehand using an ice particle generator, stored in a reservoir and then fed to the conventional entrainment based jetting head.
- The need for ice particle generators, cooled storing facilities and conveying equipment can be eliminated by forming the ice particles in situ during the water jet formation. The ice jet in this case is generated either by sub-cooling of pressurized water and controlled phase transformation during pressure relaxation in the jet nozzle, or by phase transformation by entrainment of cold liquid gases such as liquid nitrogen (N_{2}) (see: Phase diagram of water).

== Advantages ==
In comparison to other cutting technologies such as plasma cutting or laser cutting, the traditional water jet cutter technology produces extra waste material (in addition to the kerf material itself). Above all, the use of mineral abrasives for improving the performance of the cutting jet is increasingly becoming a problem. Firstly, as a consumer, it is the most significant cost factor of the process, and secondly, it represents more than 99% of the waste material generated during cutting processes. Therefore, it requires a complex and expensive waste management system. Consequently, several approaches for eliminating the need of mineral abrasives while maintaining its powerful cutting performance have been discussed by researchers.

== History ==
The first experimental researching done on Ice Jet technology dates back to 1982, when the first ice particles were created by mechanical crushing of bigger ice particles. Galecki and Vickers [Gal82] performed surface cleaning and abrading with an ice-blasting technique. The ice particles were produced by refrigeration of 3 cm blocks, which were then transferred to a container of liquid nitrogen where the ice cubes were further cooled, and finally transferred to a mechanical crusher where they were crushed and subsequently entrained into a nozzle.

Also in 1982, Krzysztof et al. showed that one of the most promising applications for ice particles is the cleaning technology. Water ice is readily available, inexpensive material, which can be used as a green manufacturing tool. Only water, electricity and refrigerant are needed for the fabrication of this tool, which can be produced just in time. The use of ice tools might practically prevent pollution and eliminate work piece contamination.

Since then, several researchers have developed equipment for producing ice particles, mainly for cleaning [Set98], polishing [His94] and surface decontaminating [Ges99] purposes. Newer research works [Shan05] and [Klu05] show that ice particles can be used for water jet applications such as cleaning, degreasing and cutting, with its concept based on the convective heat transfer between a cold cryogenic gas and atomized water droplets. Ice particles are formed inside the system by transferring latent heat of water droplets to liquid nitrogen. Kluz et al. show that the air-ice particle stream can be generated and applied for processing of bio materials and food. The performed studies showed feasibility and effectiveness of the use of fine ice powder as an abrasive, being the energy effectiveness of the process acceptable and the technology rather simple. Anyway, the process productivity is less than when using mineral abrasive particles.

A similar technology is the high pressure hybrid water-abrasive-ice jet treatment. Such technology is based on a high- pressure abrasive-water jet with addition of dry-ice pellets CO_{2}. Borkowski et al. [Bor03] show that effectiveness of surface treatment with the hybrid jet depends on the quality of ice particles.
