= Water jet cutter =

Industrial tool

A diagram of a water jet cutter: 1. high-pressure water inlet; 2. jewel (ruby or diamond); 3. abrasive (garnet); 4. mixing tube; 5. guard; 6. cutting water jet; 7. cut material

A water jet cutter, also known as a water jet or waterjet, is an industrial tool capable of cutting a wide variety of materials using an extremely high-pressure jet of water, or a mixture of water and an abrasive substance. The term abrasive jet refers specifically to the use of a mixture of water and an abrasive to cut hard materials such as metal, stone or glass, while the terms pure waterjet and water-only cutting refer to waterjet cutting without the use of added abrasives, often used for softer materials such as wood or rubber.

Waterjet cutting is often used during the fabrication of machine parts. It is the preferred method when the materials being cut are sensitive to the high temperatures generated by other methods; examples of such materials include plastic and aluminium. Waterjet cutting is used in various industries, including mining and aerospace, for cutting, shaping, and reaming.

== History ==
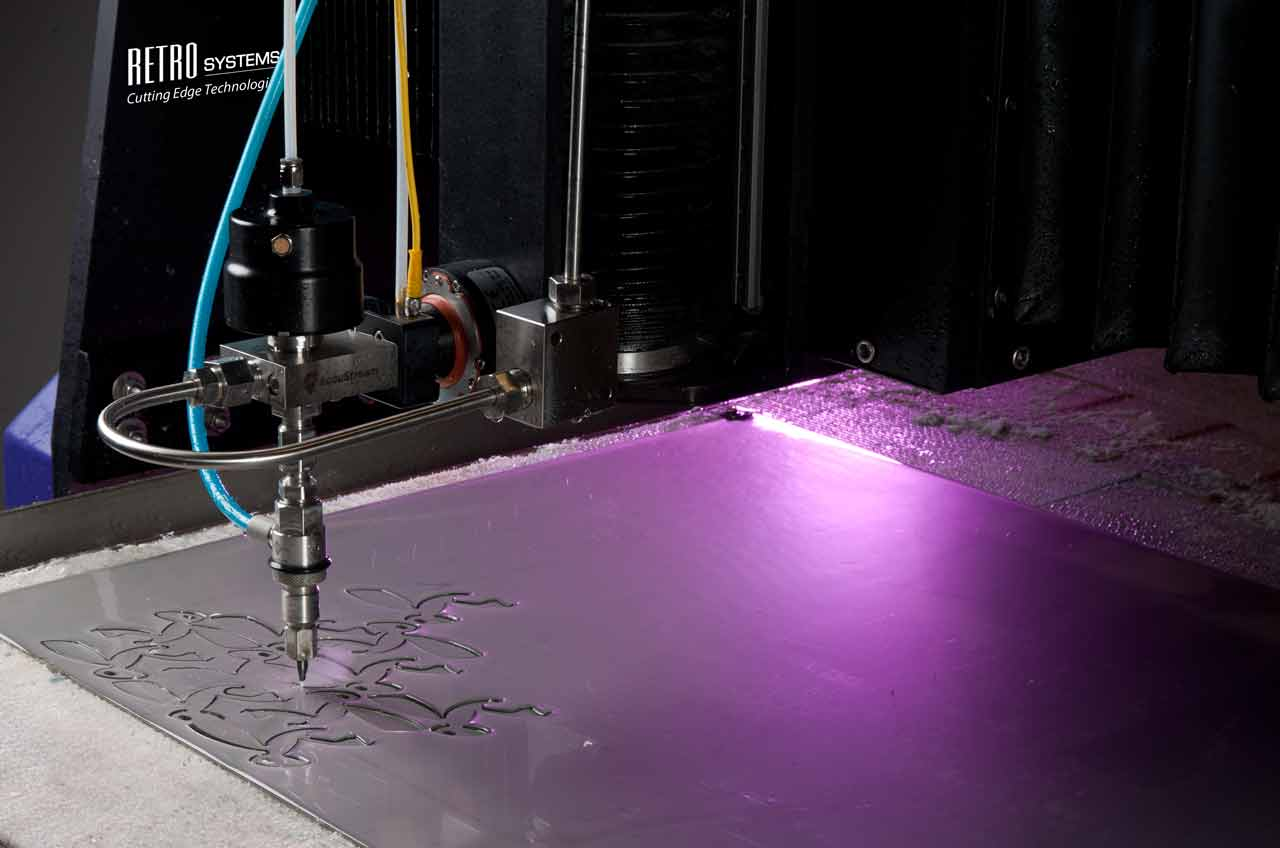
Waterjet CNC cutting machine

=== Waterjet ===
While using high-pressure water for erosion dates back as far as the mid-1800s with hydraulic mining, it was not until the 1930s that narrow jets of water started to appear as an industrial cutting device. In 1933, the Paper Patents Company in Wisconsin developed a paper metering, cutting, and reeling machine that used a diagonally moving waterjet nozzle to cut a horizontally moving sheet of continuous paper. These early applications were at low pressure and restricted to soft materials like paper.

Waterjet technology evolved in the post-war era as researchers around the world searched for new methods of efficient cutting systems. In 1956, Carl Johnson of Durox International in Luxembourg developed a method for cutting plastic shapes using a thin stream high-pressure water jet, but those materials, like paper, were soft materials. In 1958, Billie Schwacha of North American Aviation developed a system using ultra-high-pressure liquid to cut hard materials. This system used a 100,000 psi (690 MPa) pump to deliver a hypersonic liquid jet that could cut high-strength alloys such as PH15-7-MO stainless steel. Used to cut honeycomb laminate for the Mach 3 North American XB-70 Valkyrie, this cutting method resulted in delaminating at high speed, requiring changes to the manufacturing process.

While not effective for the XB-70 project, the concept was valid and further research continued to evolve waterjet cutting. In 1962, Philip Rice of Union Carbide explored using a pulsing waterjet at up to 50,000 psi (340 MPa) to cut metals, stone, and other materials. Research by S.J. Leach and G.L. Walker in the mid-1960s expanded on traditional coal waterjet cutting to determine the ideal nozzle shape for high-pressure waterjet cutting of stone, and Norman Franz in the late 1960s focused on waterjet cutting of soft materials by dissolving long-chain polymers in the water to improve the cohesiveness of the jet stream. In the early 1970s, the desire to improve the durability of the waterjet nozzle led Ray Chadwick, Michael Kurko, and Joseph Corriveau of the Bendix Corporation to come up with the idea of using corundum crystal to form a waterjet orifice, while Norman Franz expanded on this and created a waterjet nozzle with an orifice as small as 0.002 inches (0.051 mm) that operated at pressures up to 70,000 psi (480 MPa). John Olsen, along with George Hurlburt and Louis Kapcsandy at Flow Research (later Flow Industries), further improved the commercial potential of the water jet by showing that treating the water beforehand could increase the operational life of the nozzle.

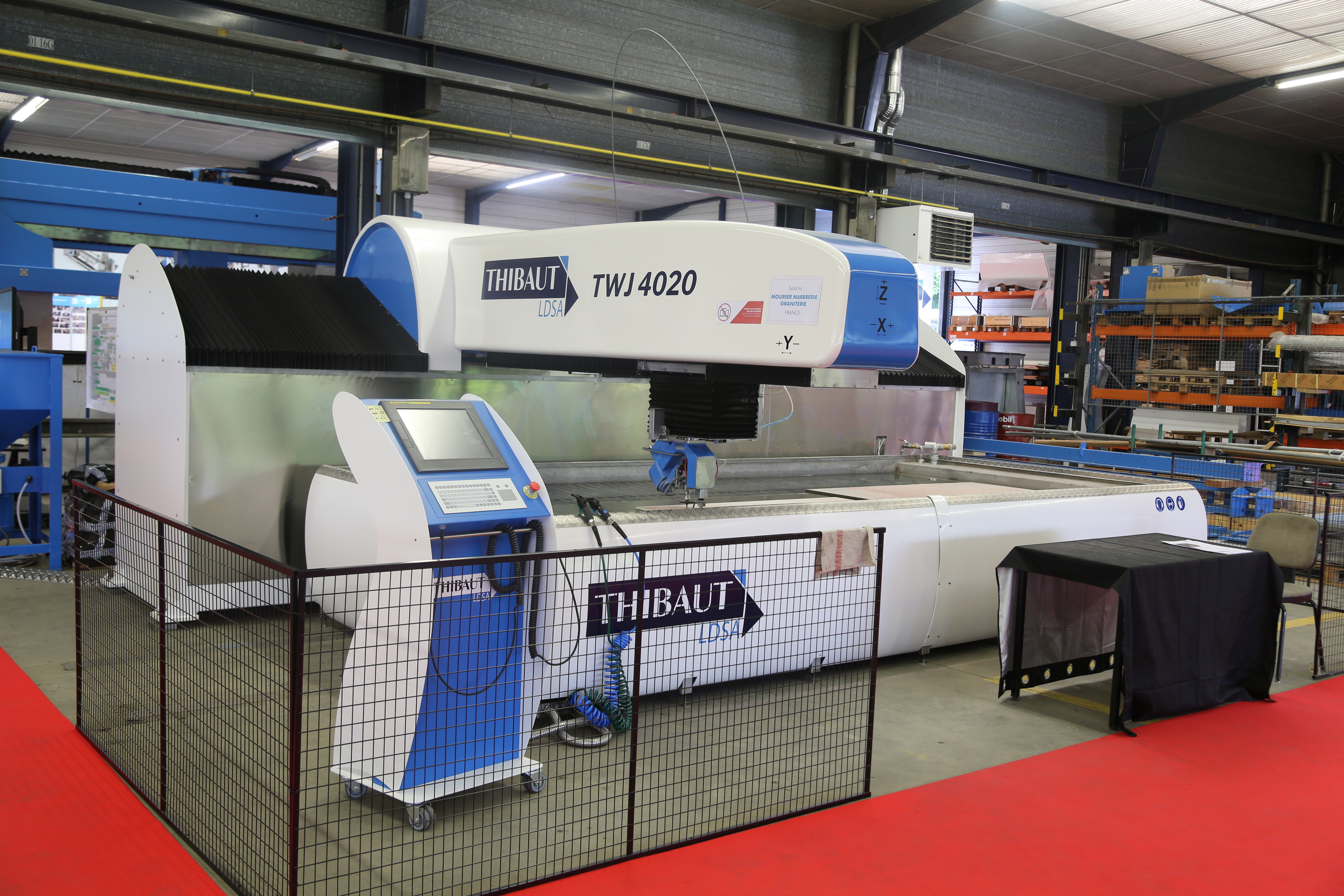
A 5-axis waterjet cutting machine

=== High pressure ===
High-pressure vessels and pumps became affordable and reliable with the advent of steam power. By the mid-1800s, steam locomotives were common and the first efficient steam-driven fire engine was operational. By the turn of the century, high-pressure reliability improved, with locomotive research leading to a sixfold increase in boiler pressure, some reaching 1,600 psi (11 MPa). Most high-pressure pumps at this time, though, operated around 500–800 psi (3.4–5.5 MPa).

High-pressure systems were further shaped by the aviation, automotive, and oil industries. Aircraft manufacturers such as Boeing developed seals for hydraulically boosted control systems in the 1940s, while automotive designers followed similar research for hydraulic suspension systems. Higher pressures in hydraulic systems in the oil industry also led to the development of advanced seals and packing to prevent leaks.

These advances in seal technology, plus the rise of plastics in the post-war years, led to the development of the first reliable high-pressure pump. The invention of Marlex by Robert Banks and John Paul Hogan of the Phillips Petroleum Company required a catalyst to be injected into the polyethylene. McCartney Manufacturing Company in Baxter Springs, Kansas, began manufacturing these high-pressure pumps in 1960 for the polyethylene industry. Flow Industries in Kent, Washington set the groundwork for commercial viability of waterjets with John Olsen's development of the high-pressure fluid intensifier in 1973, a design that was further refined in 1976. Flow Industries then combined the high-pressure pump research with their waterjet nozzle research and brought waterjet cutting into the manufacturing world.

=== Abrasive waterjet ===
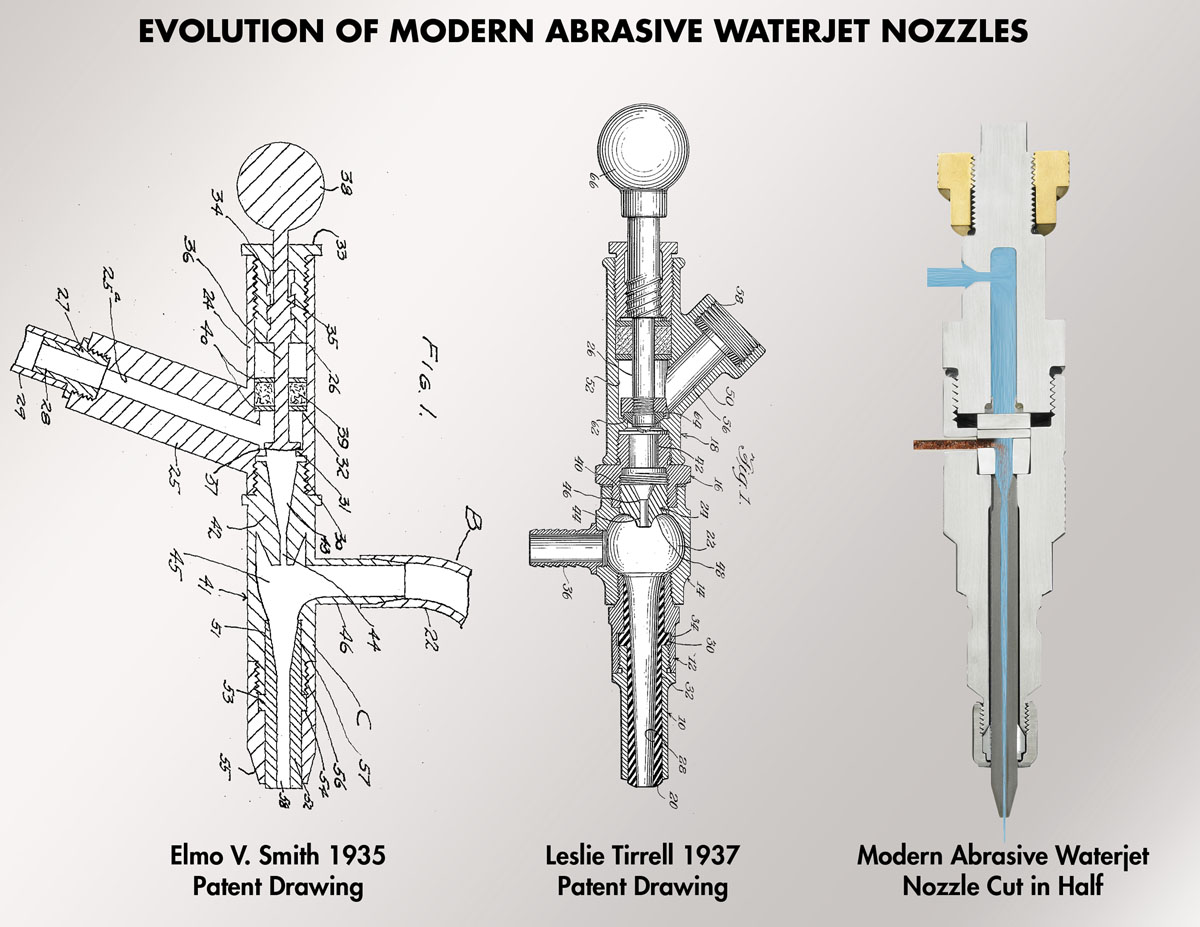
The Evolution of the Abrasive Waterjet Nozzle

While cutting with water is possible for soft materials, adding an abrasive turned the water jet into a modern machining tool for all materials. This began in 1935 when the idea of adding an abrasive to the water stream was developed by Elmo Smith for liquid abrasive blasting. Smith's design was further refined by Leslie Tirrell of the Hydroblast Corporation in 1937, resulting in a nozzle design that created a mix of high-pressure water and abrasive for the purpose of wet blasting.

Today, there are two different types of Abrasive Waterjets:

==== Abrasive water suspension jet (AWSJ) cutting ====
The abrasive water suspension jet (AWSJ) – often called “slurry jet” or “water abrasive suspension (WAS) jet” – is a specific type of abrasive water jet, which is used for waterjet cutting. In contrast to the abrasive water injector jet (AWIJ), the abrasive water suspension jet (AWSJ) is characterised by the fact that the mixing of abrasive and water takes place before the nozzle. This has the effect that, in contrast to AWIJ, the jet consists of only two components: the water and the abrasive.

Since there are only 2 components (water and abrasive) in the AWSJ, the acceleration of the abrasive grains by the water takes place with a significantly increased efficiency compared to the AWIJ. The abrasive grains become faster with the WASS than with the WAIS for the same hydraulic power of the system. Therefore, comparatively deeper or faster cuts can be made with the AWSJ.

AWSJ cutting, in contrast to the AWIJ cutting process described below, can also be used for mobile cutting applications and cutting underwater, in addition to machining demanding materials. Examples include bomb disposal, as well as the dismantling of offshore installations or the dismantling of reactor pressure vessel installations in nuclear power plants.

==== Abrasive Water Injector Jet (AWIJ) cutting ====
The AWIJ is generated by a water jet that passes through a mixing chamber (a cavity) after exiting the water nozzle and enters a focusing tube at the exit of the mixing chamber. The interaction of the water jet in the mixing chamber with the air inside creates negative pressure, the water jet entrains air particles. This negative pressure is used for the pneumatic transport of the abrasive into the chamber (the abrasive is led to a lateral opening (bore) of the mixing chamber by means of a hose).

After contact with the abrasive material in the mixing chamber with the water jet, the individual abrasive grains are accelerated and entrained in the direction of the focusing tube. The air used as a carrier medium for transporting the abrasive into the mixing chamber also becomes part of the AWIJ, which now consists of three components (water – abrasive – air). In the focusing tube, which is (should be) optimised in its length for this purpose, the abrasive is further accelerated (energy transfer from the water to the abrasive grain) and the AWIJ ideally leaves the focusing tube at the maximum possible abrasive grain speed.

=== Waterjet control ===
As waterjet cutting moved into traditional manufacturing shops, controlling the cutter reliably and accurately was essential. Early waterjet cutting systems adapted traditional systems such as mechanical pantographs and CNC systems based on John Parsons' 1952 NC milling machine and running G-code. Challenges inherent to waterjet technology revealed the inadequacies of traditional G-Code. The accuracy depends on varying the speed of the nozzle as it approaches corners and details. A major breakthrough came in the early '90s, when John Olsen developed systems to precisely position the waterjet nozzle while accurately specifying the speed at every point along the path and using common PCs as a controller.

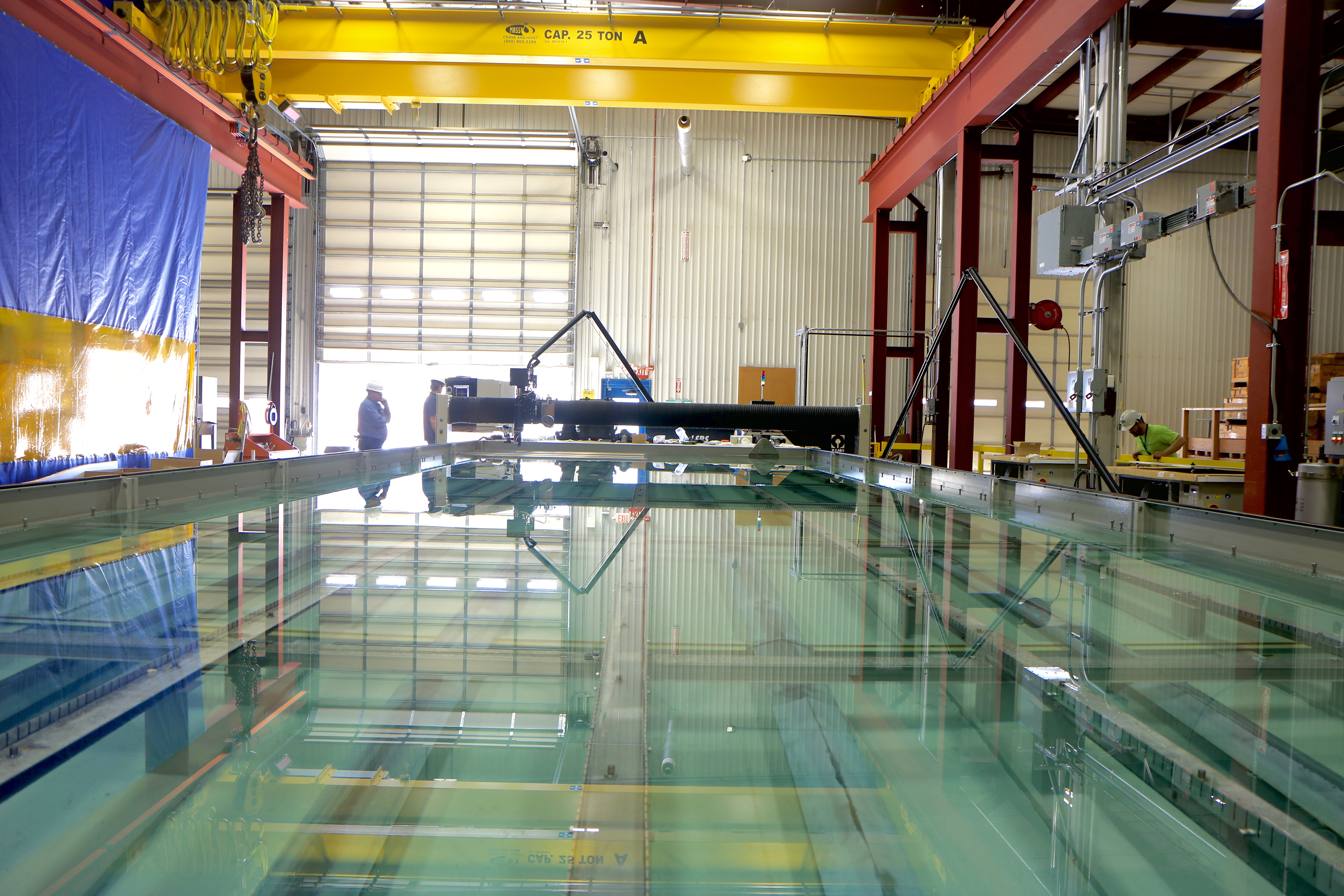
Large water jet abrasive cutting machine

== Operation ==
All waterjets follow the same principle of using high-pressure water focused into a beam by a nozzle. Most machines accomplish this by first running the water through a high-pressure pump. There are two types of pumps used to create this high pressure; an intensifier pump and a direct drive or crankshaft pump. A direct drive pump works much like a car engine, forcing water through high-pressure tubing using plungers attached to a crankshaft. An intensifier pump creates pressure by using hydraulic oil to move a piston forcing the water through a tiny hole. The water then travels along the high-pressure tubing to the nozzle of the waterjet. In the nozzle, the water is focused into a thin beam by a jewel orifice. By reducing the diameter of the waterjet the velocity of the resultant jet is increased significantly. This beam of water is ejected from the nozzle, cutting through the material by spraying it with the jet of speed in the order of Mach 3, around 2,500 ft/s (760 m/s). The process is the same for abrasive waterjets until the water reaches the cutting head. Here abrasives such as garnet and aluminium oxide are fed into a mixing chamber via an abrasive inlet. The abrasive mixes with the water in the mixing chamber and is then forced out through a focussing tube at high pressure.

== Benefits ==
An important benefit of the water jet is the ability to cut material without interfering with its inherent structure, as there is no heat-affected zone (HAZ). Minimizing the effects of heat allows metals to be cut without warping, affecting tempers, or changing intrinsic properties. Sharp corners, bevels, pierce holes, and shapes with minimal inner radii are all possible.

Water jet cutters are also capable of producing intricate cuts in material. With specialized software and 3-D machining heads, complex shapes can be produced.

The kerf, or width, of the cut can be adjusted by swapping parts in the nozzle, as well as changing the type and size of the abrasive. Typical abrasive cuts have a kerf in the range of 0.04 to 0.05 in (1.0–1.3 mm), but can be as narrow as 0.02 inches (0.51 mm). Non-abrasive cuts are normally 0.007 to 0.013 in (0.18–0.33 mm), but can be as small as 0.003 inches (0.076 mm), which is approximately that of a human hair. These small jets can permit small details in a wide range of applications.

Water jets are capable of attaining accuracy down to 0.005 inches (0.13 mm) and repeatability down to 0.001 inches (0.025 mm).

Due to its relatively narrow kerf, water jet cutting can reduce the amount of scrap material produced, by allowing uncut parts to be nested more closely together than traditional cutting methods. Water jets use approximately 0.5 to 1 US gal (1.9–3.8 L) per minute (depending on the cutting head's orifice size), and the water can be recycled using a closed-loop system. Waste water usually is clean enough to filter and dispose of down a drain. The garnet abrasive is a non-toxic material that can be mostly recycled for repeated use; otherwise, it can usually be disposed of in a landfill. Water jets also produce fewer airborne dust particles, smoke, fumes, and contaminants, reducing operator exposure to hazardous materials.

Meatcutting using waterjet technology eliminates the risk of cross contamination since the contact medium is discarded.

== Versatility ==
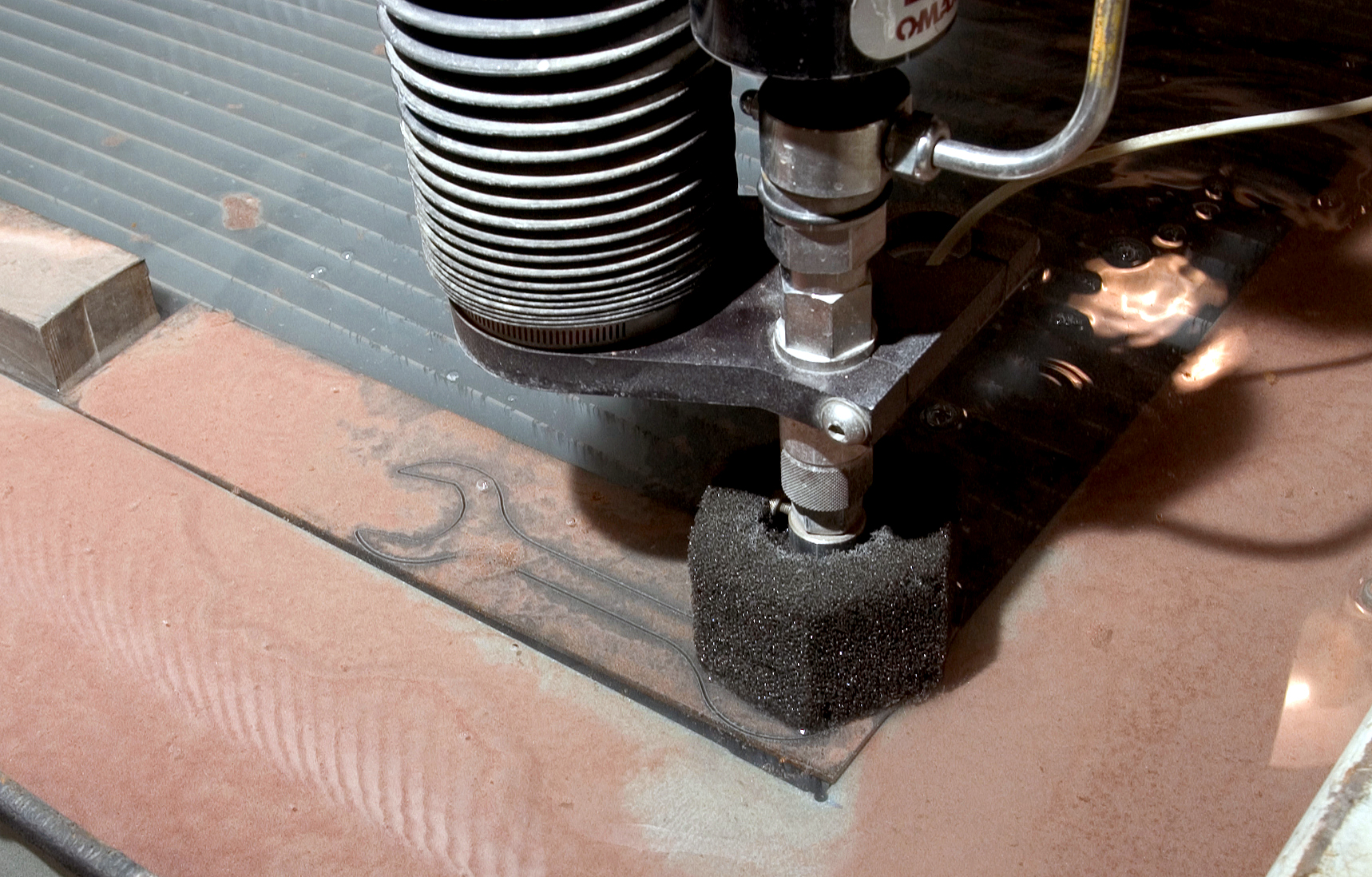
A water jet cutting a metal tool

Because the nature of the cutting stream can be easily modified the water jet can be used in nearly every industry; there are many different materials that the water jet can cut. Some of them have unique characteristics that require special attention when cutting.

Materials commonly cut with a water jet include textiles, rubber, foam, plastics, leather, composites, stone, tile, glass, metals, food, paper and much more. "Most ceramics can also be cut on an abrasive water jet as long as the material is softer than the abrasive being used (between 7.5 and 8.5 on the Mohs scale)". Examples of materials that cannot be cut with a water jet are tempered glass and diamonds. Water jets are capable of cutting up to 6 in (150 mm) of metals and 18 in (460 mm) of most materials, though in specialized coal mining applications, water jets are capable of cutting up to 100 ft (30 m) using a 1 in (25 mm) nozzle.

Specially designed water jet cutters are commonly used to remove excess bitumen from road surfaces that have become the subject of binder flushing. Flushing is a natural occurrence caused during hot weather where the aggregate becomes level with the bituminous binder layer creating a hazardously smooth road surface during wet weather.

== Availability ==
Commercial water jet cutting systems are available from manufacturers all over the world, in a range of sizes, and with water pumps capable of a range of pressures. Typical water jet cutting machines have a working envelope as small as a few square feet, or up to hundreds of square feet. Ultra-high-pressure water pumps are available from as low as 40,000 psi (280 MPa) up to 100,000 psi (690 MPa). There has also been a growth in small, desktop-sized machines that operate at pressures under 10kpsi.

== Process ==
There are six main process characteristics of water jet cutting:

1. Uses a high-velocity stream of ultra high-pressure water 30,000–90,000 psi (210–620 MPa) which is produced by a high-pressure pump with possible abrasive particles suspended in the stream.
2. Is used for machining a large array of materials, including heat-sensitive, delicate, or very hard materials.
3. Produces no heat damage to the workpiece surface or edges.
4. Nozzles are typically made of tungsten carbide.
5. Produces a taper of less than 1° on most cuts, which can be reduced or eliminated entirely by slowing down the cut process or tilting the jet.
6. Distance of the nozzle from the workpiece affects the size of the kerf and the removal rate of material. Typical distance is .125 in (3.2 mm).

Temperature is not much of a factor because the water used also acts as a coolant.

== Edge quality ==
Edge quality for water jet cut parts is defined with the quality numbers Q1 through Q5. Lower numbers indicate rougher edge finish; higher numbers are smoother. For thin materials, the difference in cutting speed for Q1 could be as much as 3 times faster than the speed for Q5. For thicker materials, Q1 could be 6 times faster than Q5. For example, 4 inches (100 mm) thick aluminium Q5 would be 0.72 in/min (18 mm/min) and Q1 would be 4.2 in/min (110 mm/min), 5.8 times faster.

== Multi-axis cutting ==
In 1987, Ingersoll-Rand Waterjet Systems offered a 5-axis pure-water waterjet cutting system called the Robotic Waterjet System. The system was an overhead gantry design, similar in overall size to the HS-1000.

With recent advances in control and motion technology, 5-axis water jet cutting (abrasive and pure) has become a reality. Where the normal axes on a water jet are named Y (back/forth), X (left/right) and Z (up/down), a 5-axis system will typically add an A axis (angle from perpendicular) and C axis (rotation around the Z-axis). Depending on the cutting head, the maximum cutting angle for the A axis can be anywhere from 55, 60, or in some cases even 90 degrees from vertical. As such, 5-axis cutting opens up a wide range of applications that can be machined on a water jet cutting machine.

A 5-axis cutting head can be used to cut 4-axis parts, where the bottom surface geometries are shifted a certain amount to produce the appropriate angle and the Z-axis remains at one height. This can be useful for applications like weld preparation where a bevel angle needs to be cut on all sides of a part that will later be welded, or for taper compensation purposes where the kerf angle is transferred to the waste material – thus eliminating the taper commonly found on water jet-cut parts. A 5-axis head can cut parts where the Z-axis is also moving along with all the other axes. This full 5-axis cutting could be used for cutting contours on various surfaces of formed parts.

Because of the angles that can be cut, part programs may need to have additional cuts to free the part from the sheet. Attempting to slide a complex part at a severe angle from a plate can be difficult without appropriate relief cuts.

== See also ==
- CryoJet
- Laser cutting
- Plasma cutting
- Electrical discharge machining
- Digital modeling and fabrication
