= APT (programming language) =

Programming language

- Paradigms: Numerical control
- Designed by: Douglas T. Ross
- First appeared: 1956; 69 years ago

Influenced
- Computer-aided manufacturing systems

APT (Automatically Programmed Tool) is a high-level computer programming language most commonly used to generate instructions for numerically controlled machine tools. Douglas T. Ross is considered by many to be the father of APT: as head of the newly created Computer Applications Group of the Servomechanisms Laboratory at MIT in 1956, he led its technical effort. APT is a language and system that alleviates the tedious mathematics of writing toolpaths for numerically controlled equipment. This early language was used widely through the 1970s and is still a standard internationally. Derivatives of APT were later developed.

== Programming language ==
APT is used to program numerically-controlled machine tools to create complex parts using a cutting tool moving in space. It is used to calculate a path that a tool must follow to generate a desired form. APT is a special-purpose language and the predecessor to modern computer aided manufacturing (CAM) systems. It was created and refined during the late 1950s and early 1960s to simplify the task of calculating geometry points that a tool must traverse in space to cut the complex parts required in the aerospace industry. It was a direct result of the new numerical control technology becoming available at that time and the daunting task that a machinist or engineer faced calculating the movements of the machine for the complex parts for which it was capable. Its development was centered at the same MIT labs that hosted the Numerical Control and the Milling Machine Projects. APT also was US Air Force sponsored and is notable for being the world's first major cooperative programming venture, combining government agencies, universities, and a 14-company team organized within the Aircraft Industries Association (now Aerospace Industries Association). APT was created before graphical user interfaces were available, and so it relies on text to specify the geometry and toolpaths needed to machine a part. The original version was created before even FORTRAN was available and was the very first ANSI standard. Later versions were rewritten in FORTRAN.

APT shares many similarities with other computer programming languages such as FORTRAN. A general-purpose computer language takes source text and converts the statements to instructions that can be processed internally by a computer. APT converts source statements into programs for driving numerically-controlled machine tools. The output from an APT processor may be a cutter location (CL) file which is then run through a post-processor specific to the desired control - machine pair. The resulting file is then run by the control of the machine to generate tool motions and other machine actions. Most commonly, this file is in some form of RS-274 format instructions, commonly known as G-code.

== Example program ==
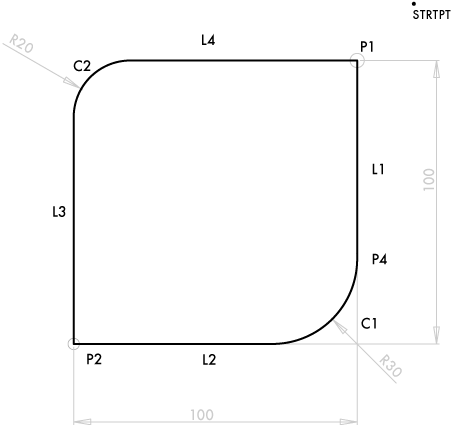
Tool path for APT-1 program

PARTNO APT-1
CLPRNT
UNITS / MM
NOPOST

$$ GEOMETRY DEFINITION
P1 = POINT / 50, 50, 0
P2 = POINT / -50, -50, 0
L1 = LINE / P1, PARLEL, (LINE / YAXIS)
L2 = LINE / P2, PERPTO, L1
L3 = LINE / P2, PARLEL, L1
L4 = LINE / P1, PERPTO, L1
C1 = CIRCLE / XSMALL, L1, YLARGE, L2, RADIUS, 30
C2 = CIRCLE / XLARGE, L3, YSMALL, L4, RADIUS, 20
PLAN1 = PLANE / 0, 0, 1, 0
PLAN2 = PLANE / PARLEL, PLAN1, ZSMALL, 16

$$ MOTION COMMANDS
LOAD / TOOL, 1
CUTTER / 20
SPINDL / 3000, CLW
FROM / (STRTPT = POINT / 70, 70, 0)
RAPID
GO / TO, L1, TO, PLAN2, TO, L4
FEDRAT / 900, PERMIN
TLLFT, GOLFT / L1, TANTO, C1
GOFWD / C1, TANTO, L2
GOFWD / L2, PAST, L3
GORGT / L3, TANTO, C2
GOFWD / C2, TANTO, L4
GOFWD / L4, PAST, L1
RAPID
GOTO / STRTPT
FINI

== Derivatives ==
Further derivatives of APT were developed, initially mainly to allow the programs to run on minicomputers instead of mainframes. These included ADAPT from IBM; EXAPT from Germany; and UNIAPT, initially from United Computing, later used alongside the Unigraphics CADCAM systems. Machine tool manufacturer's systems utilize elements of APT to this day. Standards Developers like STEP-NC took toolpath curves from APT and other sources. APT formed the basis for two early programming languages in robotics: RAPT (Robot APT) was developed at the University of Edinburgh School of Informatics, and ROBEX was a derivative of EXAPT.
