= NC-CAM =

NC-CAM is a computer-aided manufacturing software program introduced in 1989, and used by printed circuit board manufacturers to create, modify, and optimize the CNC program files used by printed circuit board drilling and routing machines. In particular, NC-CAM is used to optimize the RS-274C Excellon format files used to program Excellon, Hitachi and other printed circuit board drilling and routing machines.

NC-CAM was first developed for MS-DOS by Robert Henningsgard, and it is today developed and supplied for Microsoft Windows by FASTechnologies, Corp. of Big Lake, Minnesota, USA.
