= Vero Software =

CAD CAM company

Vero Software Ltd
- Industry: Computer Aided Design, Computer Aided Manufacturing, Computer Aided Engineering
- Founded: Italy, October 1988
- Headquarters: Cheltenham, England
- Area served: Worldwide
- Key people: Steve Sivitter (Chief Executive), Julie Randall (Finance Director), Marc Freebrey (Marketing Director)
- Products: Alphacam, Cabinet Vision, Edgecam, Javelin, Machining Strategist, PEPS, Radan, SMIRT, SURFCAM, VISI, WorkNC
- Owner: Hexagon AB
- Website: verosoftware.com

Vero Software is a company based in Cheltenham, England, that specialises in CAD CAM (Computer Aided Design and Manufacturing).

== History ==
Vero was founded in Northern Italy in October 1988 by Don Babbs and Ezio Galardo when they left Olivetti. In the mid 1990s, its VISI-CAD and VISI-CAM products were the first to use the PC implementation of the Parasolid kernel.

The company was incorporated in 1997 under the name Deepcredit Limited, and then renamed as VI Group Plc in 1998 prior to its listing on the London Stock Market. In October 2007, the company was renamed to Vero Software.

On 11 August 2008, Vero Software Plc and its UK subsidiaries Vero UK Limited and Camtek Limited moved to a combined facility in Cheltenham, Gloucestershire from its previous location in Stroud. In 2010 and 2014 Vero Software was awarded 'The Queens Award for Enterprise'.

Vero Software develops and distributes software for aiding the design and manufacturing processes, providing solutions for the tooling, production engineering, sheet metal, metal fabrication, stone and woodworking industries. The company's brands include Alphacam, Cabinet Vision, Edgecam, Machining STRATEGIST, PEPS, Radan, SMIRT, SURFCAM, VISI, and WorkNC, along with the production control MRP system Javelin.

The company has direct offices in the UK, Germany, Italy, France, Japan, USA, Brazil, Netherlands, China, Korea, Spain and India supplying products to more than 45 countries through its wholly owned subsidiaries and expansive reseller network.

== Acquisitions and capital funds ==
- May 2000 – acquired an Italian software company formerly known as Tecnocam for $349k plus shares.
- March 2001 – acquired the Electronic Data Interchange, a division of the South Wales-based Ubiquity Software Corporation used for the secure transfer of automotive CAD/CAM data for $361k.
- May 2001 – November 2003 – raised up to €4.2million from a Eureka development grant Accordingly, the Company recognised $680k due to the Eureka grant and other Italian grant awards as development cost savings in the 2002 accounts.
- May 2002 – Raised $4.6m from the stock market.
- July 2002 – took over its US subsidiary for the assumption of $355k in debt and forgiveness of another $259k of debt.
- August 2002 – sold its office in Prague for $33k.
- September 2002 – acquired machining STRATEGIST and the majority of the programming team from NC Graphics for £1m cash plus shares.
- May 2003 – Received £143k from the South West Regional Development Agency.
- December 2006 – acquired Camtek, a nearby CAM software supplier.
- July 2010 – Battery Ventures acquires Vero Software.
- October 2011 – acquired Planit Software.
- January 2013 – acquired Sescoi International.
- February 2013 – acquired Surfcam.
- August 2014 – Vero Software was acquired by Hexagon AB.

== Solutions ==
Production CAM:

- Edgecam: a production CAM software for milling, turning and mill-turn machining.
- Surfcam: is a CNC Programming software for 2 axis to 5 axis machining.
- Machining Strategist: is a 3D CAM software for roughing and finishing CNC toolpaths .

MOLD & DIE / AUTOMOTIVE:

- VISI: is a CAD/CAM software for the mould & die manufacturing industry.
- WorkNC: is a CNC software for 2D, 3D and 5-Axis machining of surface or solid models in mould, die and tooling
- Smirt: is a 3D viewing / CAM and process management for the die build stamping industry .

VERIFICATION:

- NCSIMUL:

TOOL MANAGEMENT:

- Fasys:

SHEET METAL:

- Radan: is a CAD/CAM software for the design and laser cutting, punching and bending of sheet metal components.

ERP/MES:

- Javelin: is software for Manufacturing Resource Planning and Production Control Software.
- Workplan: is software for Manufacturing Resource Planning and Production Control Software.

WIRE EDM:

- Peps: is a 3D CAM software for wire EDM and multi-axis laser programming.

WOOD:

- Alphacam: is a CAM software for wood, stone, composites and metal components from 2-Axis through to 5-Axis NC programming.
- Cabinet Vision: is a software to design, price, render and build for woodworkers and cabinetmakers.
