= Electrical discharge machining =

Metal fabrication process

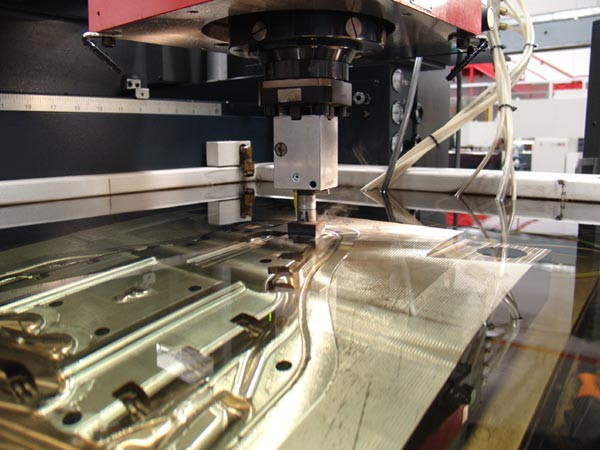
An electrical discharge machine

Electrical discharge machining (EDM), also sometimes known as spark machining or spark eroding, is a metal cutting process whereby a desired shape is obtained by using electrical discharges (sparks). Material is removed from the work piece by a series of rapidly recurring current discharges between two electrodes, separated by a dielectric liquid and subject to an electric voltage. One of the electrodes is called the tool electrode (or simply the tool or electrode), while the other is called the workpiece electrode, or workpiece. The electrode is usually either a wire or a machined die. A wire electrode is well suited to cutting a thin kerf, and the process is called wire EDM (also sometimes wire burning or wire erosion). A die-type electrode can repeatedly create precise copies of the negative geometry of the die shape, and the process is called sinker EDM (or less commonly, die-sinking EDM). The process depends upon the tool and workpiece not making physical contact. Extremely hard materials like carbides, ceramics, titanium alloys and heat treated tool steels that are very difficult to machine using conventional machining can be precisely machined by EDM.

When the voltage between the two electrodes is increased, the intensity of the electric field in the volume between the electrodes becomes greater, causing dielectric break down of the liquid, and produces an electric arc. As a result, material is removed from the electrodes. Once the current stops (or is stopped, depending on the type of generator), new liquid dielectric is conveyed into the inter-electrode volume, enabling the solid particles (debris) to be carried away and the insulating properties of the dielectric to be restored. Adding new liquid dielectric in the inter-electrode volume is commonly referred to as flushing. After a current flow, the voltage between the electrodes is restored to what it was before the breakdown, so that a new liquid dielectric breakdown can occur to repeat the cycle.

== History ==
The erosive effect of electrical discharges was first noted in 1770 by English physicist Joseph Priestley.

=== Die-sink EDM ===
Two Soviet scientists, B. R. Lazarenko and N. I. Lazarenko, were tasked in 1943 to investigate ways of preventing the erosion of tungsten electrical contacts due to sparking. They failed in this task but found that the erosion was more precisely controlled if the electrodes were immersed in a dielectric fluid. This led them to invent an EDM machine used for working difficult-to-machine materials such as tungsten. The Lazarenkos' machine is known as an R-C-type machine, after the resistor–capacitor circuit (RC circuit) used to charge the electrodes.

Simultaneously, but independently, an American team, Harold Stark, Victor Harding, and Jack Beaver, developed an EDM machine for removing broken drills and taps from aluminium castings. Initially constructing their machines from under-powered electric-etching tools, they were not very successful. But more powerful sparking units, combined with automatic spark repetition and fluid replacement with an electromagnetic interrupter arrangement produced practical machines. Stark, Harding, and Beaver's machines produced 60 sparks per second. Later machines based on their design used vacuum tube circuits that produced thousands of sparks per second, significantly increasing the speed of cutting.

=== Wire-cut EDM ===
The wire-cut type of machine arose in the 1960s for making tools (dies) from hardened steel. The tool electrode in wire EDM is simply a wire. To avoid the erosion of the wire causing it to break, the wire is wound between two spools so that the active part of the wire is constantly changing. The earliest numerical controlled (NC) machines were conversions of punched-tape vertical milling machines. The first commercially available NC machine built as a wire-cut EDM machine was manufactured in the USSR in 1967. Machines that could optically follow lines on a master drawing were developed by David H. Dulebohn's group in the 1960s at Andrew Engineering Company for milling and grinding machines. Master drawings were later produced by computer numerical controlled (CNC) plotters for greater accuracy. A wire-cut EDM machine using the CNC drawing plotter and optical line follower techniques was produced in 1974. Dulebohn later used the same plotter CNC program to directly control the EDM machine, and the first CNC EDM machine was produced in 1976.

Commercial wire EDM capability and use has advanced substantially during recent decades. Feed rates have increased and surface finish can be finely controlled.

== Generalities ==
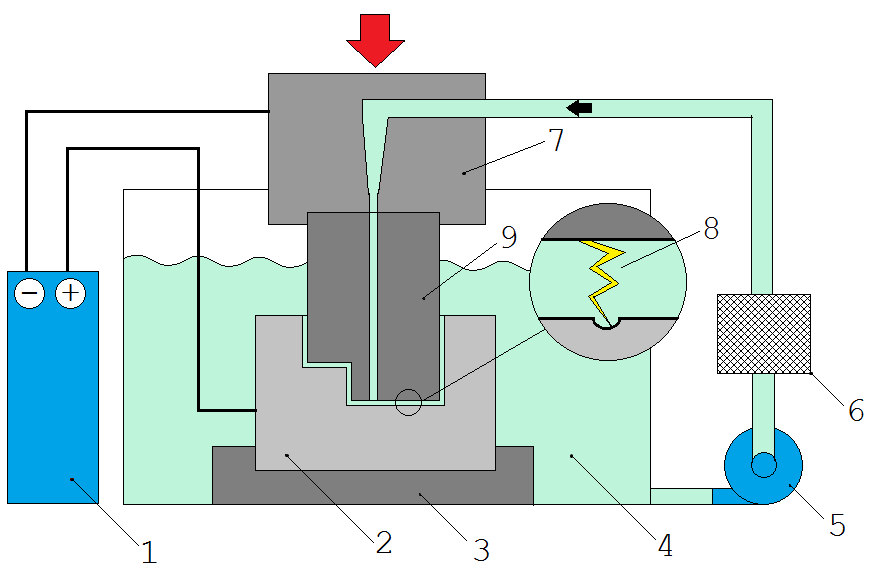
1 Pulse generator (DC). 2 Workpiece. 3 Fixture. 4 dielectric fluid. 5 Pump. 6 Filter. 7 Tool holder. 8 Spark. 9 Tool.

Electrical discharge machining is a machining method primarily used for hard metals or those that would be very difficult to machine with traditional techniques. EDM typically works with materials that are electrically conductive, although methods have also been proposed for using EDM to machine insulating ceramics. EDM can cut intricate contours or cavities in pre-hardened steel without the need for heat treatment to soften and re-harden them. This method can be used with any other metal or metal alloy such as titanium, Hastelloy, kovar, and inconel. Also, applications of this process to shape polycrystalline diamond tools have been reported.

EDM is often included in the "non-traditional" or "non-conventional" group of machining methods together with processes such as electrochemical machining (ECM), water jet cutting (WJ, AWJ), laser cutting, and opposite to the "conventional" group (turning, milling, grinding, drilling, and any other process whose material removal mechanism is essentially based on mechanical forces).

To obtain a specific geometry, the EDM tool is guided along the desired path very close to the work; ideally it should not touch the workpiece, although in reality this may happen due to the performance of the specific motion control in use. In this way, a large number of current discharges (colloquially also called sparks) happen, each contributing to the removal of material from both tool and workpiece, where small craters are formed. The size of the craters is a function of the technological parameters set for the specific job at hand. They can be with typical dimensions ranging from the nanoscale (in micro-EDM operations) to some hundreds of micrometers in roughing conditions.

The presence of these small craters on the tool results in the gradual erosion of the electrode. This erosion of the tool-electrode is also referred to as wear. Strategies are needed to counteract the detrimental effect of the wear on the geometry of the workpiece. One possibility is that of continuously replacing the tool-electrode during a machining operation. This is what happens if a continuously replaced wire is used as electrode. In this case, the correspondent EDM process is also called wire EDM. The tool-electrode can also be used in such a way that only a small portion of it is actually engaged in the machining process and this portion is changed on a regular basis. This is, for instance, the case when using a rotating disk as a tool-electrode. The corresponding process is often also referred to as EDM grinding.

A further strategy consists in using a set of electrodes with different sizes and shapes during the same EDM operation. This is often referred to as multiple electrode strategy, and is most common when the tool electrode replicates in negative the wanted shape and is advanced towards the blank along a single direction, usually the vertical direction (i.e. z-axis). This resembles the sink of the tool into the dielectric liquid in which the workpiece is immersed, so it is often referred to as die-sinking EDM (also called conventional EDM and ram EDM). The corresponding machines are often called sinker EDM. Usually, the electrodes of this type have quite complex forms. If the final geometry is obtained using a usually simple-shaped electrode which is moved along several directions and is possibly also subject to rotations, often the term EDM milling is used.

In any case, the severity of the wear is strictly dependent on the technological parameters used in the operation (for instance: polarity, maximum current, open circuit voltage). For example, in micro-EDM, also known as μ-EDM, these parameters are usually set at values which generates severe wear. Therefore, wear is a major problem in that area.

The problem of wear to graphite electrodes is being addressed. In one approach, a digital generator, controllable within milliseconds, reverses polarity as electro-erosion takes place. That produces an effect similar to electroplating that continuously deposits the eroded graphite back on the electrode. In another method, a so-called "Zero Wear" circuit reduces how often the discharge starts and stops, keeping it on for as long a time as possible.

== Definition of the technological parameters ==
Difficulties have been encountered in the definition of the technological parameters that drive the process.

Two broad categories of generators, also known as power supplies, are in use on EDM machines commercially available: the group based on RC circuits and the group based on transistor-controlled pulses.

In both categories, the primary parameters at setup are the current and frequency delivered. In RC circuits, however, little control is expected over the time duration of the discharge, which is likely to depend on the actual spark-gap conditions (size and pollution) at the moment of the discharge. Also, the open circuit voltage (i.e. the voltage between the electrodes when the dielectric is not yet broken) can be identified as steady state voltage of the RC circuit.

In generators based on transistor control, the user is usually able to deliver a train of pulses of voltage to the electrodes. Each pulse can be controlled in shape, for instance, quasi-rectangular. In particular, the time between two consecutive pulses and the duration of each pulse can be set. The amplitude of each pulse constitutes the open circuit voltage. Thus, the maximum duration of discharge is equal to the duration of a pulse of voltage in the train. Two pulses of current are then expected not to occur for a duration equal or larger than the time interval between two consecutive pulses of voltage.

The maximum current during a discharge that the generator delivers can also be controlled. Because other sorts of generators may also be used by different machine builders, the parameters that may actually be set on a particular machine will depend on the generator manufacturer. The details of the generators and control systems on their machines are not always easily available to their user. This is a barrier to describing unequivocally the technological parameters of the EDM process. Moreover, the parameters affecting the phenomena occurring between tool and electrode are also related to the controller of the motion of the electrodes.

A framework to define and measure the electrical parameters during an EDM operation directly on inter-electrode volume with an oscilloscope external to the machine has been recently proposed by Ferri et al. These authors conducted their research in the field of μ-EDM, but the same approach can be used in any EDM operation. This would enable the user to estimate directly the electrical parameters that affect their operations without relying upon machine manufacturer's claims. When machining different materials in the same setup conditions, the actual electrical parameters of the process are significantly different.

== Material removal mechanism ==
The first serious attempt at providing a physical explanation of the material removal during electric discharge machining is perhaps that of Van Dijck. Van Dijck presented a thermal model together with a computational simulation to explain the phenomena between the electrodes during electric discharge machining. However, as Van Dijck himself admitted in his study, the number of assumptions made to overcome the lack of experimental data at that time was quite significant.

Further models of what occurs during electric discharge machining in terms of heat transfer were developed in the late eighties and early nineties. It resulted in three scholarly papers: the first presenting a thermal model of material removal on the cathode, the second presenting a thermal model for the erosion occurring on the anode and the third introducing a model describing the plasma channel formed during the passage of the discharge current through the dielectric liquid. Validation of these models is supported by experimental data provided by AGIE.

These models give the most authoritative support for the claim that EDM is a thermal process, removing material from the two electrodes because of melting or vaporization, along with pressure dynamics established in the spark-gap by the collapsing of the plasma channel. However, for small discharge energies the models are inadequate to explain the experimental data. All these models hinge on a number of assumptions from such disparate research areas as submarine explosions, discharges in gases, and failure of transformers, so it is not surprising that alternative models have been proposed more recently in the literature trying to explain the EDM process.

Among these, the model from Singh and Ghosh reconnects the removal of material from the electrode to the presence of an electrical force on the surface of the electrode that could mechanically remove material and create the craters. This would be possible because the material on the surface has altered mechanical properties due to an increased temperature caused by the passage of electric current. The authors' simulations showed how they might explain EDM better than a thermal model (melting or evaporation), especially for small discharge energies, which are typically used in μ-EDM and in finishing operations.

Given the many available models, it appears that the material removal mechanism in EDM is not yet well understood and that further investigation is necessary to clarify it, especially considering the lack of experimental scientific evidence to build and validate the current EDM models. This explains an increased current research effort in related experimental techniques.

== Types ==
=== Sinker EDM ===
Sinker EDM allowed quick production of 614 uniform injectors for the J-2 rocket engine, six of which were needed for each trip to the moon.

Sinker EDM, also called ram EDM, cavity type EDM or volume EDM, consists of an electrode and workpiece submerged in an insulating liquid such as, more typically, oil or, less frequently, other dielectric fluids. The electrode and workpiece are connected to a suitable power supply. The power supply generates an electrical potential between the two parts. As the electrode approaches the workpiece, dielectric breakdown occurs in the fluid, forming a plasma channel, and a small spark jumps.

These sparks usually strike one at a time, because it is very unlikely that different locations in the inter-electrode space have the identical local electrical characteristics which would enable a spark to occur simultaneously in all such locations. These sparks happen in huge numbers at seemingly random locations between the electrode and the workpiece. As the base metal is eroded, and the spark gap subsequently increased, the electrode is lowered automatically by the machine so that the process can continue uninterrupted. Several hundred thousand sparks occur per second, with the actual duty cycle carefully controlled by the setup parameters. These controlling cycles are sometimes known as "on time" and "off time", which are more formally defined in the literature.

The on time setting determines the length or duration of the spark. Hence, a longer on time produces a deeper cavity from each spark, creating a rougher finish on the workpiece. The reverse is true for a shorter on time. Off time is the period of time between sparks. Although not directly affecting the machining of the part, the off time allows the flushing of dielectric fluid through a nozzle to clean out the eroded debris. Insufficient debris removal can cause repeated strikes in the same location which can lead to a short circuit. Modern controllers monitor the characteristics of the arcs and can alter parameters in microseconds to compensate. The typical part geometry is a complex 3D shape, often with small or odd shaped angles. Vertical, orbital, vectorial, directional, helical, conical, rotational, spin, and indexing machining cycles are also used.

=== Wire EDM ===
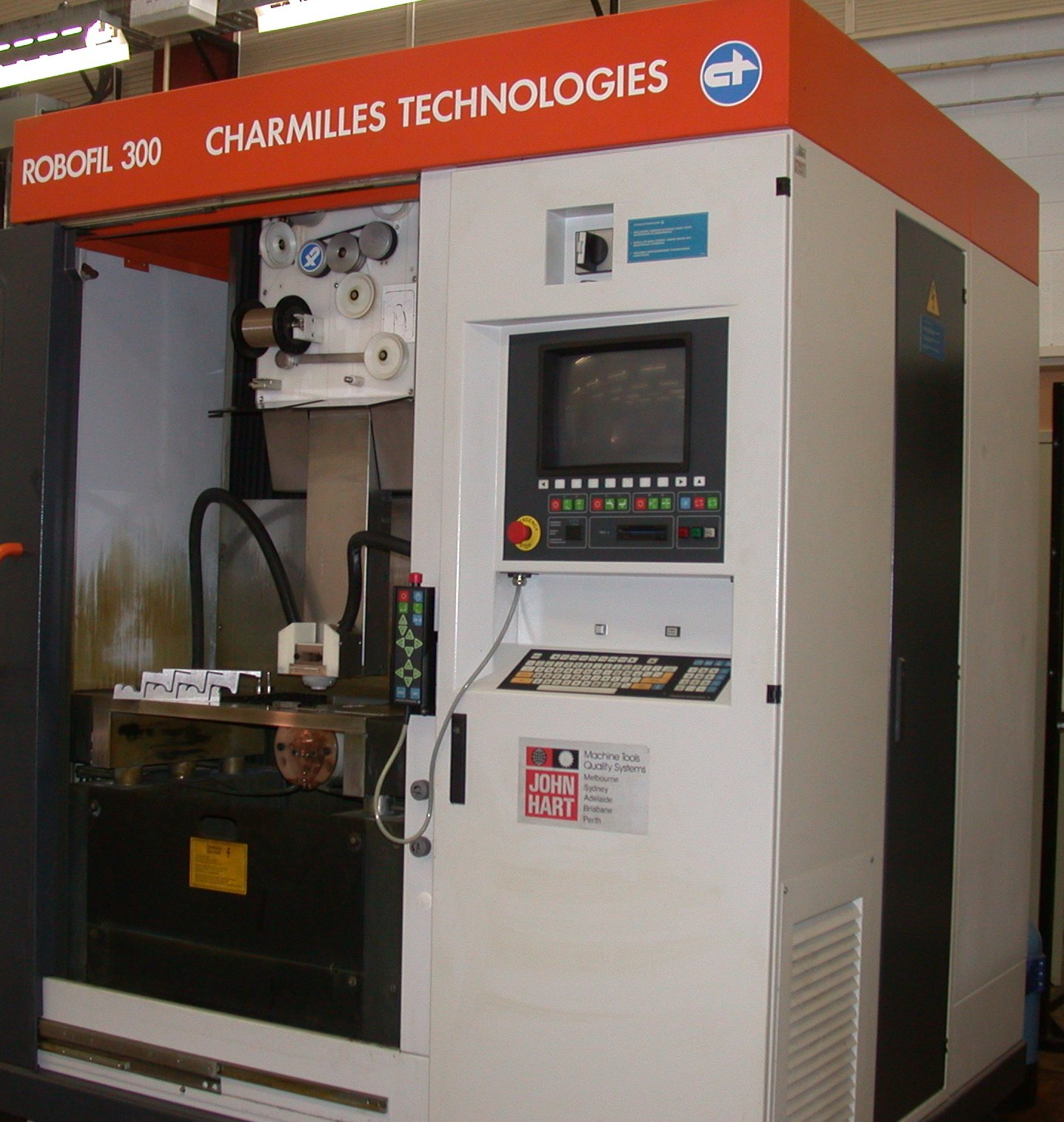
CNC Wire-cut EDM machine

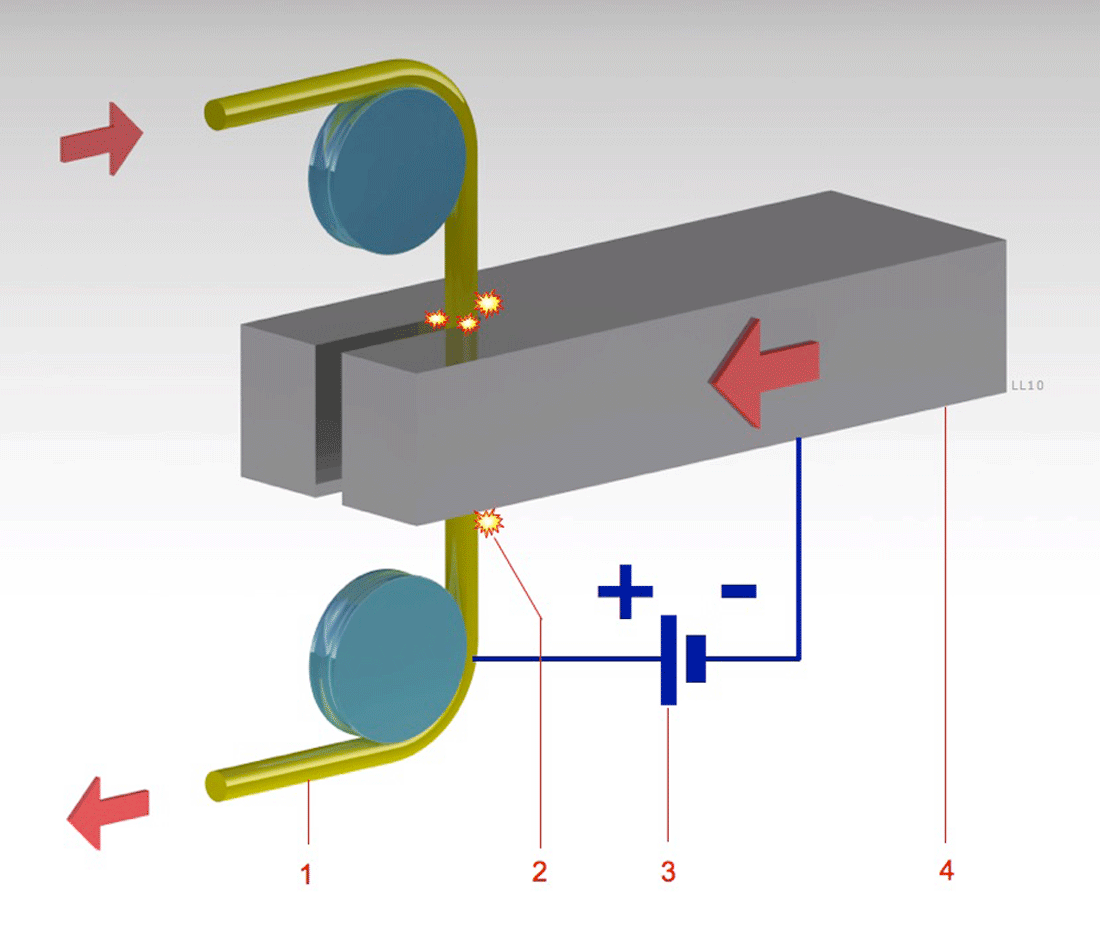
1 Wire. 2 Electrical discharge erosion (Electric arc). 3 Electrical potential. 4 Workpiece

In wire electrical discharge machining (WEDM), also known as wire-cut EDM and wire cutting, a thin single-strand metal wire, usually brass, is fed through the workpiece, submerged in a tank of dielectric fluid, typically deionized water. Wire-cut EDM is typically used to cut plates as thick as 300 mm (12 in) and to make punches, tools, and dies from hard metals that are difficult to machine with other methods.

The wire, which is constantly fed from a spool, is held between upper and lower diamond guides which is centered in a water nozzle head. The guides, usually CNC-controlled, move in the x–y plane. On most machines, the upper guide can also move independently in the z–u–v axis, giving rise to the ability to cut tapered and transitioning shapes (circle on the bottom, square at the top for example). The upper guide can control axis movements in the GCode standard, x–y–u–v–i–j–k–l–. This allows the wire-cut EDM to be programmed to cut very intricate and delicate shapes.

The upper and lower diamond guides are usually accurate to 0.004 mm (0.16 mils), and can have a cutting path or kerf as small as 0.021 mm (0.83 mils) using Ø 0.02 mm (0.79 mils) wire, though the average cutting kerf that achieves the best economic cost and machining time is 0.335 mm (13.2 mils) using Ø 0.25 mm (9.8 mils) brass wire. The reason that the cutting width is greater than the width of the wire is because sparking occurs from the sides of the wire to the work piece, causing erosion. This "overcut" is necessary, for many applications it is adequately predictable and therefore can be compensated for (for instance in micro-EDM this is not often the case). Spools of wire are long — an 8 kg (18 lb) spool of 0.25 mm (9.8 mils) wire is just over 19 kilometres (12 mi) in length. Wire diameter can be as small as 20 μm (0.79 mils) and the geometry precision is not far from ± 1 μm (0.039 mils).

The wire-cut process uses water as its dielectric fluid, controlling its resistivity and other electrical properties with filters and PID controlled de-ionizer units. The water flushes the cut debris away from the cutting zone. Flushing is an important factor in determining the maximum feed rate for a given material thickness.

The electrode used in Wire EDM is typically made from brass, copper, or coated materials such as zinc-coated or diffusion-annealed wires. Brass wire is the most commonly used due to its balance of conductivity, tensile strength, and cost-effectiveness. Coated wires are often employed to improve cutting speed, reduce wire breakage, and enhance surface finish by facilitating more stable electrical discharges.

Along with tighter tolerances, multi axis EDM wire-cutting machining centers have added features such as multi heads for cutting two parts at the same time, controls for preventing wire breakage, automatic self-threading features in case of wire breakage, and programmable machining strategies to optimize the operation.

Wire-cutting EDM is commonly used when low residual stresses are desired, because it does not require high cutting forces for removal of material. If the energy per pulse is relatively low (as in finishing operations), little change in the mechanical properties of a material is expected due to these low residual stresses, although material that hasn't been stress-relieved can distort in the machining process.

The work piece may undergo a significant thermal cycle, its severity depending on the technological parameters used. Such thermal cycles may cause formation of a recast layer on the part and residual tensile stresses on the work piece. If machining takes place after heat treatment, dimensional accuracy will not be affected by heat treat distortion.

=== Hole drilling EDM ===
Hole drilling EDM was designed for producing fast, accurate, small, deep holes. It is conceptually akin to sinker EDM but the electrode is a rotating tube conveying a pressurized jet of dielectric fluid. It can make a hole an inch deep in about a minute and is a good way to machine holes in materials too hard for twist-drill machining. This EDM drilling type is used largely in the aerospace industry, producing cooling holes into aero blades and other components. It is also used to drill holes in industrial gas turbine blades, in molds and dies, and in bearings.

== Applications ==
=== Prototype production ===
The EDM process is most widely used by the mold-making, tool, and die industries, but is becoming a common method of making prototype and production parts, especially in the aerospace, automobile and electronics industries in which production quantities are relatively low. In sinker EDM, a graphite, copper tungsten, or pure copper electrode is machined into the desired (negative) shape and fed into the workpiece on the end of a vertical ram.

=== Coinage die making ===
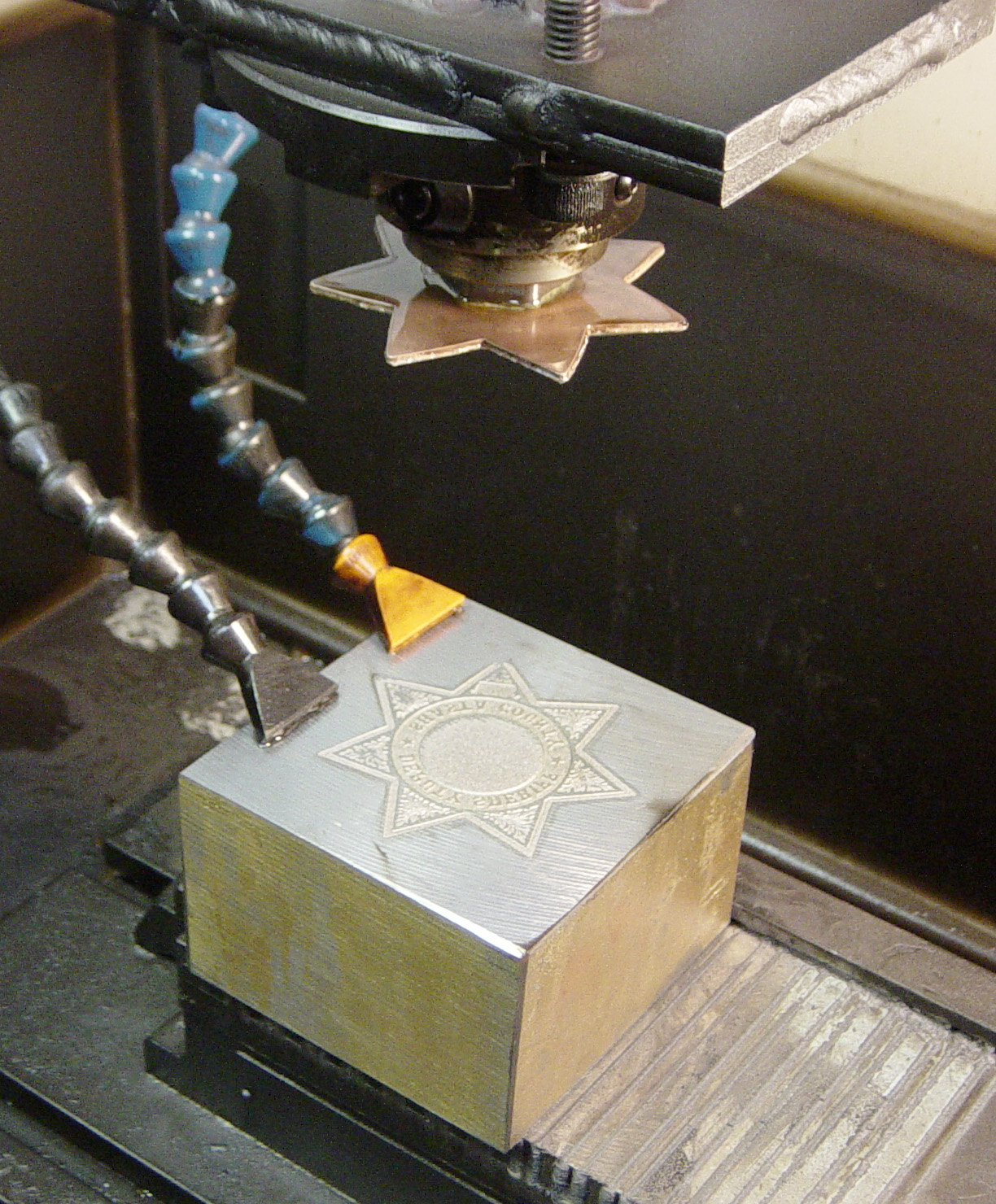
Master at top, badge die workpiece at bottom, oil jets at left (oil has been drained). Initial flat stamping will be "dapped", see sinking (metalworking), to give a curved surface.

For the creation of dies for producing jewelry and badges, or blanking and piercing (through use of a pancake die) by the coinage (stamping) process, the positive master may be made from sterling silver, since (with appropriate machine settings) the master is significantly eroded and is used only once. The resultant negative die is then hardened and used in a drop hammer to produce stamped flats from cutout sheet blanks of bronze, silver, or low proof gold alloy. For badges these flats may be further shaped to a curved surface by another die. This type of EDM is usually performed submerged in an oil-based dielectric. The finished object may be further refined by hard (glass) or soft (paint) enameling, or electroplated with pure gold or nickel. Softer materials such as silver may be hand engraved as a refinement.

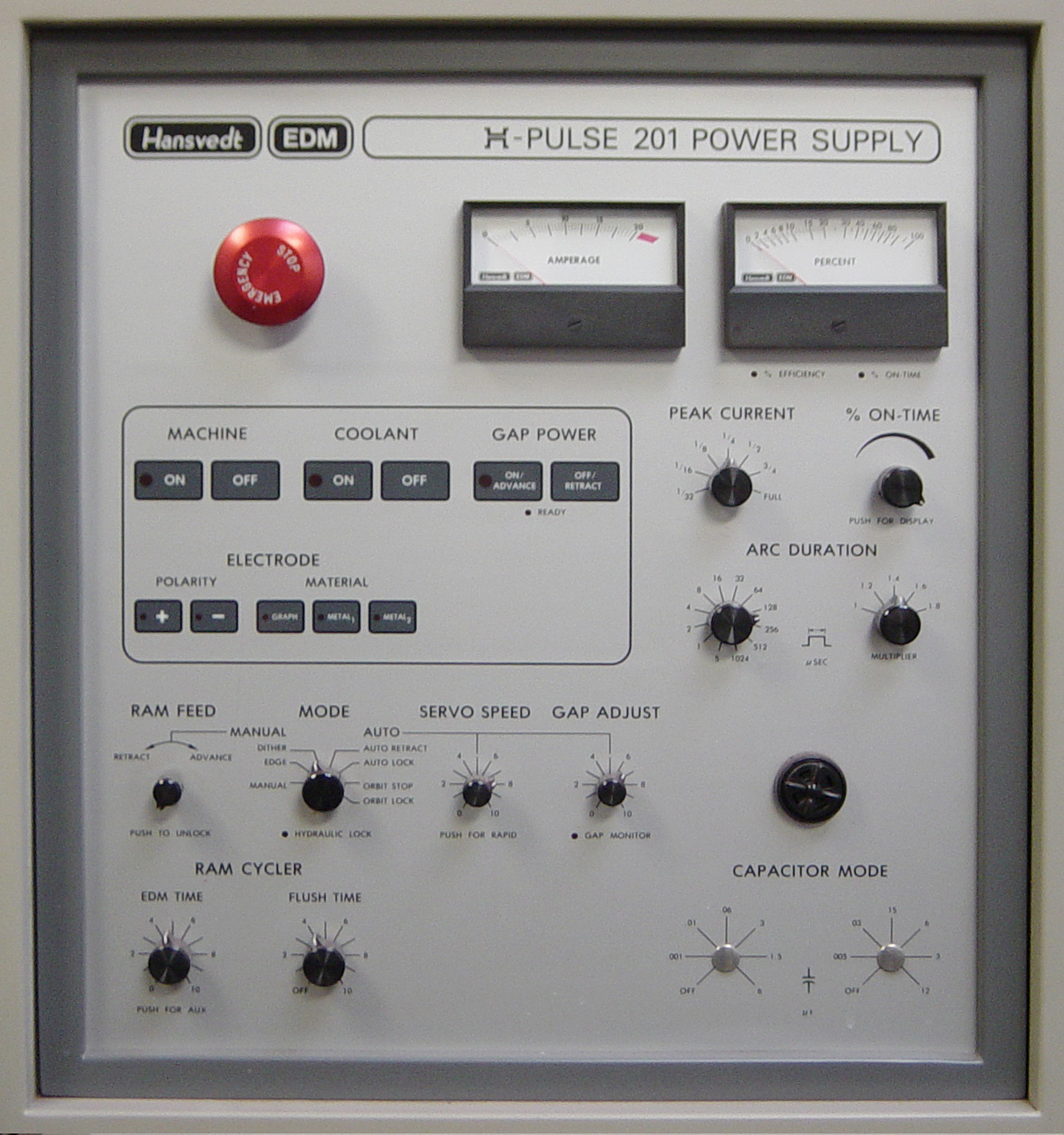
EDM control panel (Hansvedt machine). Machine may be adjusted for a refined surface (electropolish) at end of process.

=== Small hole drilling ===
A turbine blade with internal cooling as applied in the high-pressure turbine.

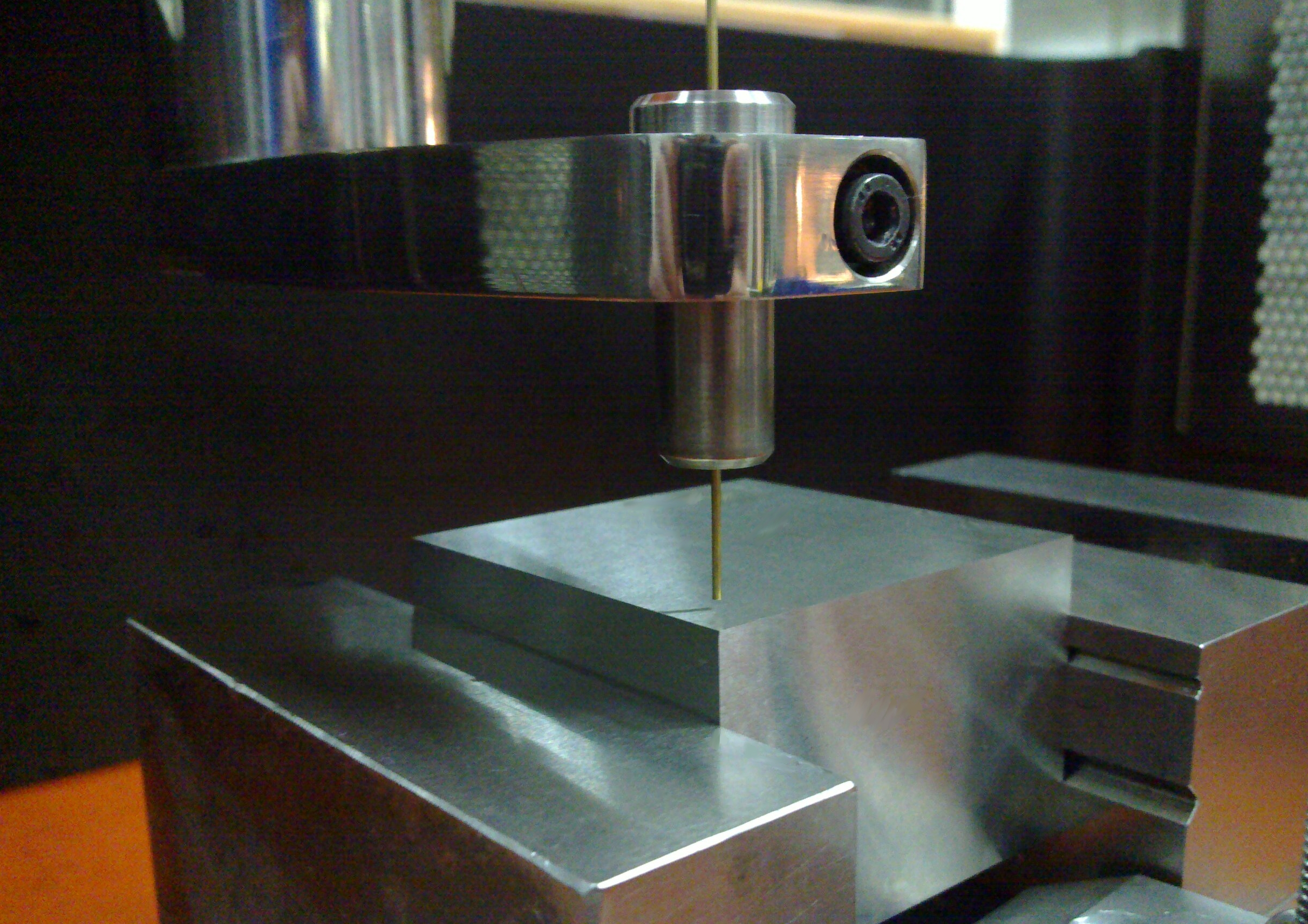
Small hole drilling EDM machines.

Small hole drilling EDM is used in a variety of applications.

On wire-cut EDM machines, small hole drilling EDM is used to make a through hole in a workpiece through which to thread the wire for the wire-cut EDM operation. A separate EDM head specifically for small hole drilling is mounted on a wire-cut machine and allows large hardened plates to have finished parts eroded from them as needed and without pre-drilling.

Small hole EDM is used to drill rows of holes into the leading and trailing edges of turbine blades used in jet engines. Gas flow through these small holes allows the engines to use higher temperatures than otherwise possible. The high-temperature, very hard, single crystal alloys employed in these blades makes conventional machining of these holes with high aspect ratio extremely difficult, if not impossible.

Small hole EDM is also used to create microscopic orifices for fuel system components, spinnerets for synthetic fibers such as rayon, and other applications.

There are also stand-alone small hole drilling EDM machines with an x–y axis also known as a super drill or hole popper that can machine blind or through holes. EDM drills bore holes with a long brass or copper tube electrode that rotates in a chuck with a constant flow of distilled or deionized water flowing through the electrode as a flushing agent and dielectric. The electrode tubes operate like the wire in wire-cut EDM machines, having a spark gap and wear rate. Some small-hole drilling EDMs are able to drill through 100 millimetres (3.9 in) of soft or hardened steel in less than 10 seconds, averaging 50% to 80% wear rate. Holes of 0.3 to 6.1 millimetres (0.012 to 0.240 in) can be achieved in this drilling operation. Brass electrodes are easier to machine but are not recommended for wire-cut operations due to eroded brass particles causing "brass on brass" wire breakage, therefore copper is recommended.

=== Metal disintegration machining ===
Several manufacturers produce EDM machines for the specific purpose of removing broken cutting tools and fasteners from work pieces. In this application, the process is termed "metal disintegration machining" or MDM. The metal disintegration process removes only the center of the broken tool or fastener, leaving the hole intact and allowing a ruined part to be reclaimed.

=== Closed-loop manufacturing ===
Closed-loop manufacturing can improve the accuracy and reduce the tool costs

== Advantages and disadvantages ==
EDM is often compared to electrochemical machining. Advantages of EDM include:

- Ability to machine complex shapes that would otherwise be difficult to produce with conventional cutting tools.
- Machining of extremely hard material to very close tolerances.
- Very small work pieces can be machined where conventional cutting tools may damage the part from excess cutting tool pressure.
- There is no direct contact between tool and work piece. Therefore, delicate sections and weak materials can be machined without perceivable distortion.
- A good surface finish can be obtained; a very good surface may be obtained by redundant finishing paths.
- Very fine holes can be attained.
- Tapered holes may be produced.
- Pipe or container internal contours and internal corners down to R 0.001".

Disadvantages of EDM include:

- Difficulty finding expert machinists.
- The slow rate of material removal.
- Potential fire hazard associated with use of combustible oil based dielectrics.
- The additional time and cost used for creating electrodes for ram/sinker EDM.
- Reproducing sharp corners on the workpiece is difficult due to electrode wear.
- Specific power consumption is very high.
- Power consumption is high.
- "Overcut" is formed.
- Excessive tool wear occurs during machining.
- Electrically non-conductive materials can be machined only with specific set-up of the process.
- A recast layer is formed at the cut surface due to melting of the material by the arc.

== See also ==
- Electrochemical machining

== Bibliography ==
- Jameson, E. C. (2001). Electrical Discharge Machining. SME. ISBN 978-0-87263-521-0. Archived from the original on 2011-09-28.
