= CNC riveting =

CNC process for obtaining mechanical fastening of shapes

CNC riveting is a CNC process used for obtaining permanent mechanical fastening of geometrical shapes, ranging from simple to complex shapes, such as aircraft fuselages. This is done in a shorter duration of time with a high riveting rate. The process is fast, robust, and is flexible in nature; thus improving its usage and providing reliability to the riveted joint along with the final product quality. CNC riveting can be used for a variety of operations ranging from riveting and fastening belts, skin panels, shear ties, and other internal fuselage components.

The CNC Riveting machines generally consist of a solid frame made of welded steel and aluminum frames used for protection fitted with polycarbonate panes. The dynamic drive of the coordinates axes is achieved by a recirculating ball and screw, servo motors and motion control units that make the high-speed movement possible. For the mounting of the riveting units, solid C Frames are used. The riveting program can be given various parameters and these can be changed or altered as desired to be CNC programs as per the requirement.

== CNC riveting machine variants ==
=== CNC duct riveting cell ===
A CNC controlled automatic riveting work cell with a knee type design drill machine that has sixty-inch throat depth with four positions on the upper head. This machine can apply sixteen pounds of upset force. This machine is equipped with dual drill spindles, one for carrying out drilling and other for deburring. It was developed for the fabrication of tubular assemblies, which are fed into the throat of the machine over an eight-inch square lower knee. The CNC-controlled four-axis positioning system presents the part to the machine that carries out the riveting.

=== CNC riveting machines with stationary machine table ===
These CNC machines act as stand-alone workstations for heavy and bigger workpieces. They are simple in design and require work holding fixtures only, so the clamping and component query devices are much more affordable.

=== CNC riveting machines with Indexing Tables ===
These special purpose CNC riveting machines have different sizes of indexing tables that be composed of different coordinate axes and riveting machines. These machines have different versions for the particular application and are configured accordingly. The coordinate system has linear units and recirculating ball screws, and an index table that is electrically operated with a brake motor. It has two to four fixed indexing stations, and the index table are NC flexible rotary indexing tables which are actuated by two hand controls or by a pedal switch. The machine has an automatic tool changer.

=== CNC riveting machines with transfer system ===
These CNC riveting machines are made for use in manufacturing lines. The fixtures are coded and interfaces are customized to make the connection of several CNC riveting machines and linking them with other manufacturing systems, making it possible to obtain a high degree of automation.

=== Multiple axes CNC riveting cell ===
This is the latest technological development in automated fastening. This technology is versatile and can be used for riveting of high curvature fuselage panels to low curvature wing panels, bulkheads, floor etc. The tooling changeover is minimized thus part throughput is maximized.

== Advantages ==
The main advantages of this type of CNC riveting machine are that it can use a variable minimum distance between rivets, and rivets of different length or heights can be used. High flexibility and change over time due to programmable memory. It can process many workpieces and different rivets can be used in one operation. Picking and placing operations are done in parallel with the primary operation time, saving money. Menu based navigation makes the programming fluid. High acceleration rate with high positioning accuracy.
