= Part program =

Sequence of CNC instructions to be executed by a machine tool

In machining, a part program is the sequence of computer numerical control (CNC) instructions that describe the work that is to be done to a part. Typically these instructions are generated in computer-aided manufacturing (CAM) software in the form of G-code commands, which are then read and executed by the onboard computer of the desired machine tool. The machines to be controlled may include drills, lathes, mills, grinders, or routers.

When multiple repetitive operations are needed on a large number of parts, canned cycles can be used to reduce the number of operation blocks in a part program. In some cases, a part might need to go between multiple machines and have multiple operations performed on it to generate the geometry that is needed.

An example of the order of operations seen in a typical program:

Program start
Load selected tool
Turn spindle on
Turn coolant on
G00 Rapid to starting position above part
All machining operations to part
Turn coolant off
Turn spindle off
Move to safe position
End program

== Types of operations ==
Each type CNC machine will have different name for the operation they perform to parts to achieve the desired geometry on a part such as tasks like drilling, or cutting threads, but perform these actions differently. The choice to use a mill or lathe comes down to the geometry of the part you are making and how the machine can hold onto the part and what operation you want to perform to achieve the geometry needed. If the part is very complicated it may go through multiple part programs to achieve the desired results.

=== CNC Mill ===
- Contour milling
- Milling pockets
- Cutting slots
- Chamfering edges
- Thread milling
- Drilling holes
- Tapping holes

=== CNC Lathe ===
- Rough facing surfaces
- Finish facing surfaces
- Face drilling
- Cross drilling
- Face contouring
- Cutting threads
- Cutting groves
- Cutting parts off

== See also ==
- G-code
- c-code
- Computer-aided manufacturing
- Computer-aided design
- Canned cycle
- Computer-aided technologies
