= Punching machine =

A punching machine is a machine tool for punching and embossing flat sheet-materials to produce form-features needed as mechanical element and/or to extend static stability of a sheet section.

== CNC punching ==
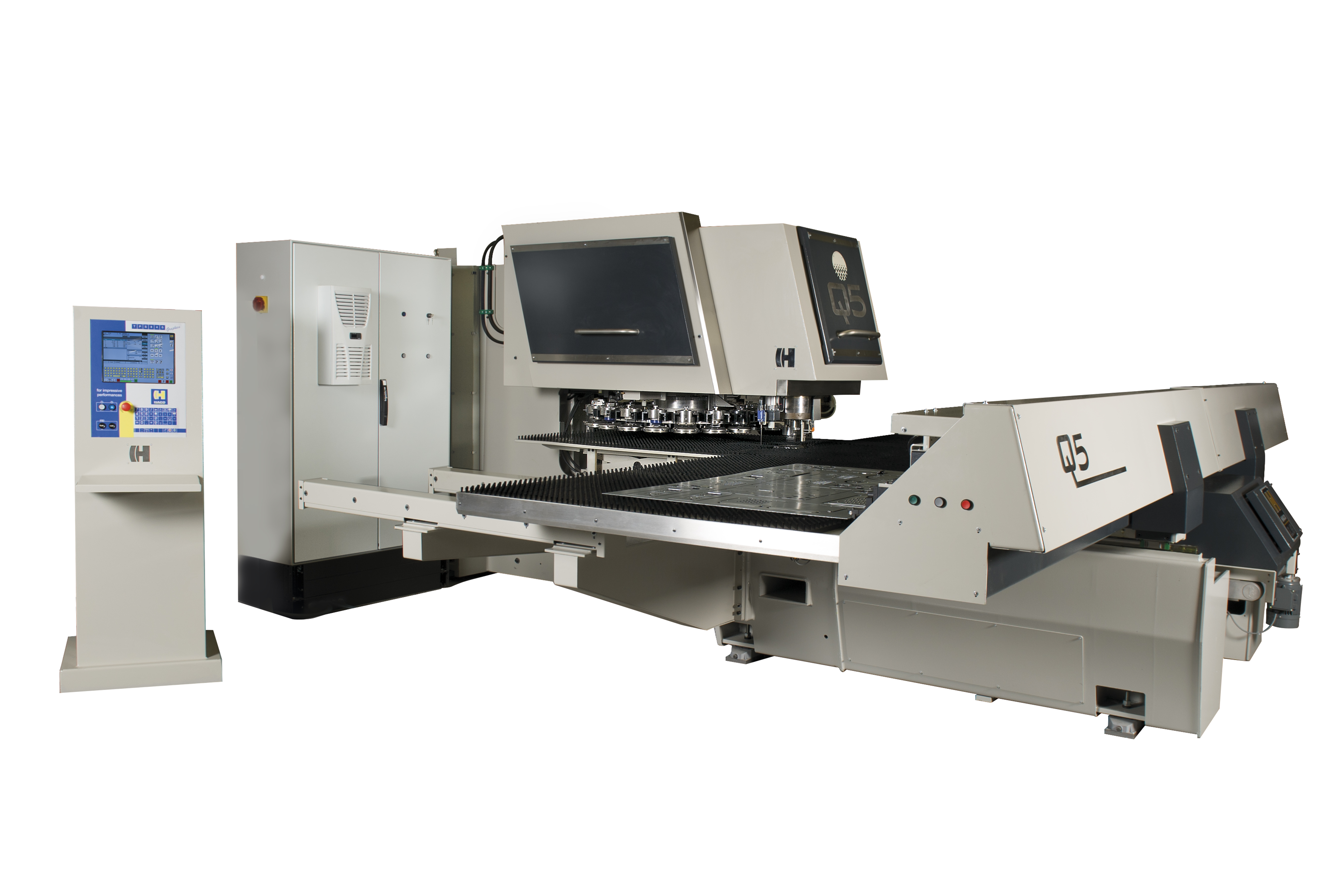
A HACO CNC punching machine

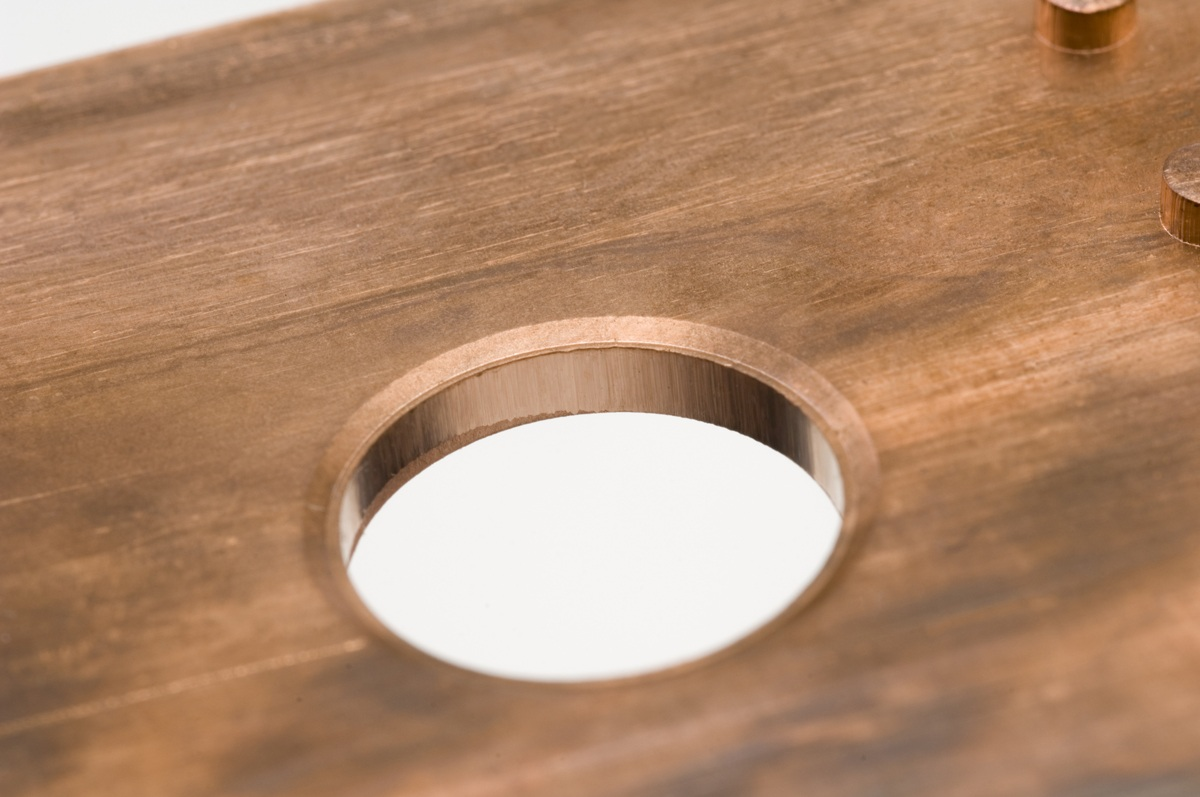
Punched hole: best results for cutting surface with above 70% cutting, low clearance necessary (8% material thickness)

Punch presses are developed for high flexibility and efficient processing of metal stampings. The main areas of application are for small and medium runs. Those machines are typically equipped with a linear die carrier (tool carrier) and quick change tools. Today the method is used where the application of lasers are inefficient or technically impractical. CNC is the abbreviation of Computer Numerically Controlled.

== Principle of operation ==
After programming the work pieces and entering length of bars the control automatically calculates the maximum number of pieces to be punched (for example, 18 pieces of a bar of 6000 mm). Once the desired number of work pieces is entered, the bar is pushed toward the stop. The machine is fully automated once the production process is launched.

The third CNC axis always moves the cylinder exactly over the tool, which keeps the wear on the bearings and tools to a minimum. All pieces are sent down a slat conveyor and are pushed sideways on a table. Any scrap is carried to the end of the conveyor and dropped into a bin. Different workpieces can be produced within one work cycle to optimize production.

== Programming ==
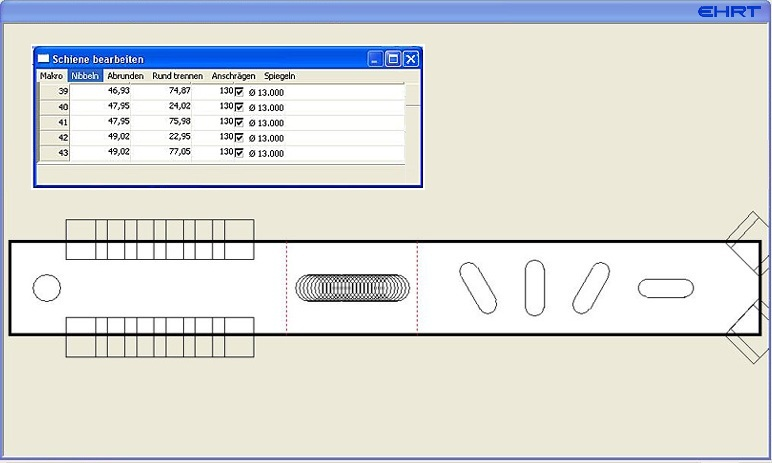
Punching software with graphical user interface, intuitive operable

Programming is done on a PC equipped with appropriate software that can be part of the machine or a connected external workstation. For generating a new program engineering data can be imported or pasted per mouse and keyboard. Through a graphic and menu-driven user interface previous CNC programming skills are not required. All the punches in a work piece are shown on the screen making programming mistakes easily detected. Ideally each program is stored in one database, so it is easy to recover them by search and sort functions. When selecting a new piece, all the necessary tooling changes are displayed. Before transferring it to the control unit the software scans each program for possible collisions. This eliminates most handling errors.

== Tool change system ==
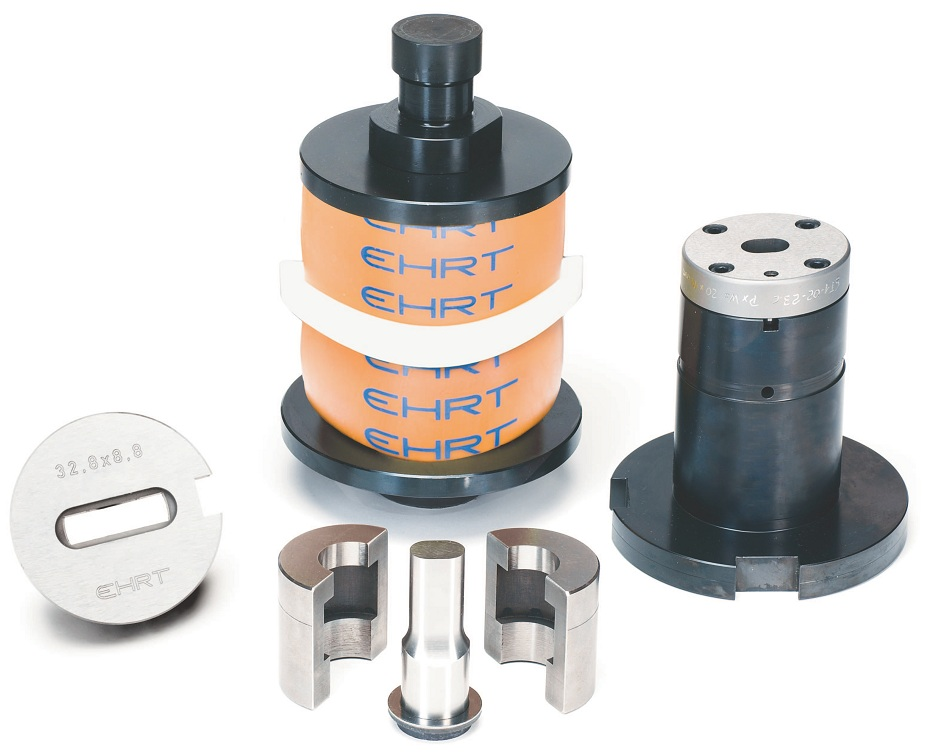
Quick change tool system, plug and punch (left: die; front: punch, split punch retainer; back: tool body; right: punch guide)

The linear tool carrier (y-axis) has several stations that hold the punching tools and one cutting tool. Especially for flexibility and efficient processing are set up times a crucial cost factor. Downtimes should be reduced to a minimum. Therefore, recent tool systems are designed for fast and convenient change of punches and dies. They are equipped with a special plug-in system for a quick and easy change of tools.

There is no need to screw anything together. The punch and die plate are adjusted to each other automatically punches and dies can be changed rapidly meaning less machine downtime.

== Networking with the whole production line ==
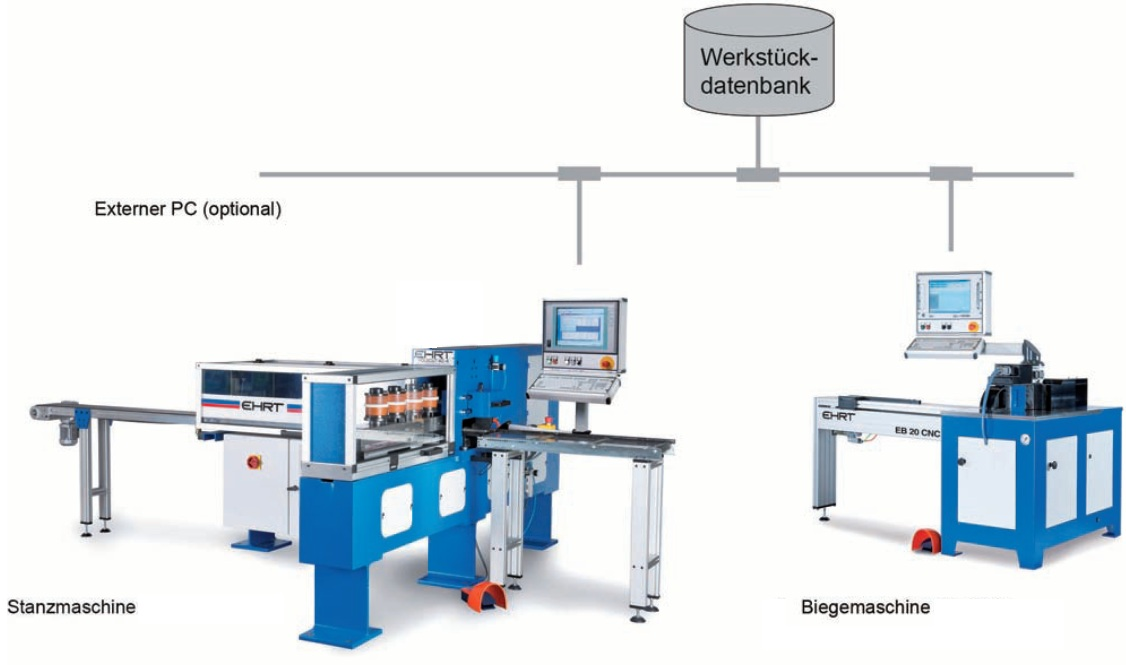
Shared network connecting machines, PC workstations, internet, etc.

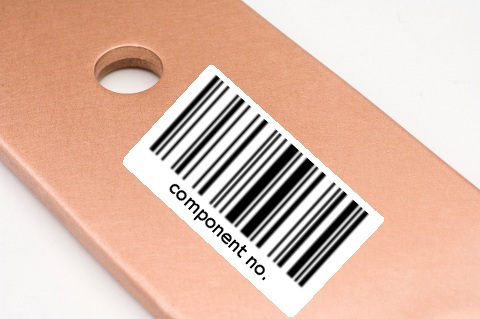
Labeling of the workpiece, connection to work schedule program fetch per barcode

A lot of organizational effort and interface management is saved, if the CNC punch press is connected to the previous and subsequent process. For a connection to other machines and external workstations corporate interfaces have to be established.

- One software for programming subsequent production steps at once
- Using a standard industrial PC a variety of machines can be easily networked with among each other
- shared database for easy integration into existing workflow system and backup at an external server
- import production data from other systems or from construction programs (e.g. DXF files)

== Integration of further production steps ==
Besides punching, machines of the high-end class can be equipped with special functions. For example:

- Automatic labelling and marking of work pieces
- Chipless thread forming by electric driven quick change tools
- Automatic infeeding system - loading of the machine
- Embossing digits and characters
- Coining nubs

== See also ==
- Turret punch
- Punch press
