= Optical tracer =

An optical tracer is an X-Y tooling machine which utilises a photoeye to track toolpaths printed on a full-scale drawing and move a tool head accordingly. No Z-axis or cut commands can be read from the drawing, so an operator was still required to tell the machine, when and how deep it should cut.

It has been made largely obsolete by CNC systems.

== See also ==
- Polygraph
- Computer numerical control (CNC)
