= Maslow CNC =

Open-source CNC router project

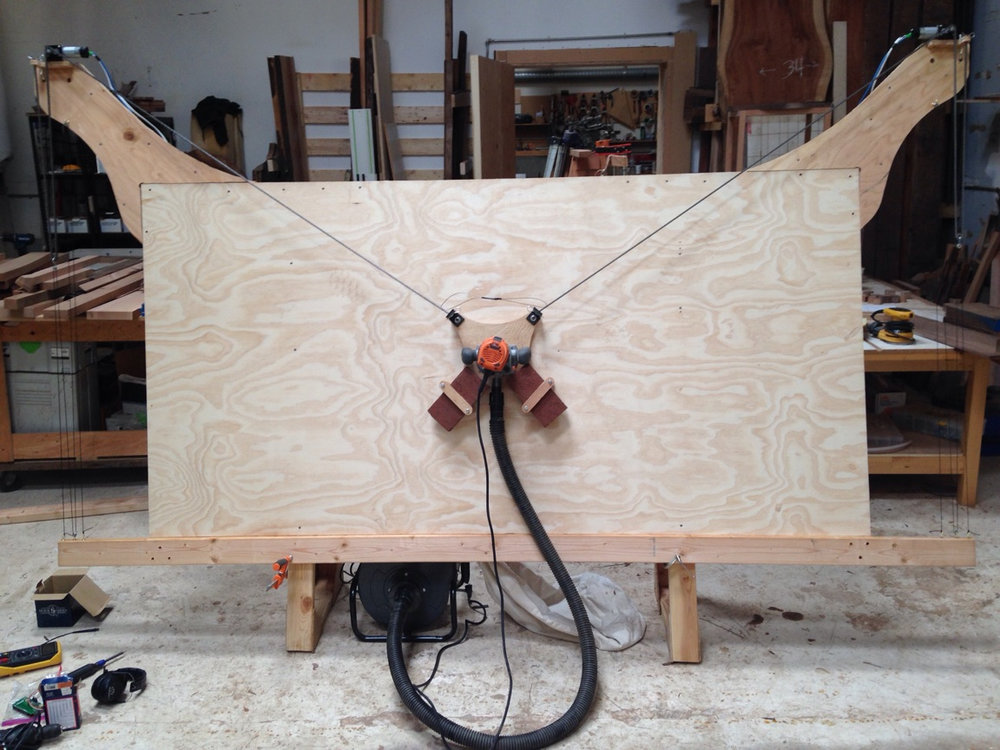
- Classification: Computer numerical control router
- Inventor: Bar Smith, Hannah Teagle and Tom Beckett

Maslow CNC is an open-source CNC router project. It is the only commercially available vertical CNC router and is notable for its low cost of US$500.

Although the kit is advertised at $500, like many tools, additional initial material and hardware costs are required. The kits are now sold by three re-sellers range in price from $400 to $500. Lumber and plywood are required to make the machine's frame along with an appropriate and compatible router. Lastly, a personal computer or tablet is needed with Windows, Mac OSX or Linux as its operating system. Overall initial material costs approximately $800.

The unique vertical design mimics a hanging plotter allowing it to have a 2440 mm × 1220 mm (4' x 8') cutting area with a footprint 3 meters (10') wide and 48 cm (19") deep. Maslow CNC uses geared motors with encoders (8148 counts/rev) and a closed loop feedback system to achieve a resolution of ±0.4mm. To reduce cost, Maslow CNC comes in kit form, uses a commercial off-the-shelf handheld router provided by the user for the router spindle, uses an Arduino Mega microprocessor, and uses a large number of common hardware items rather than custom parts.

The Maslow CNC project was created 2016 by Bar Smith, Hannah Teagle and Tom Beckett. The project was funded with preorders on Kickstarter, raising $314,000. It was featured on Tested and was shown at Maker Faire Bay Area 2017.

Maslow CNC ran a second Kickstarter campaign August 1-30, 2023 for the Maslow4, a revised Maslow design with the following differences from the original Maslow:

- The sled position is controlled using four belts which are anchored at four corners instead of two chains,
- The motors which attach to the belts are mounted on the sled rather than the frame,
- The motors use current feedback to detect the tension on the belts.
- Maslow CNC Participants in the campaign were Bar Smith and Roman Gromov.

The Kickstarter campaign was successfully funded with 1,486 backers pledging $822,580. Delivery of Maslow4 kits was estimated to occur starting in December, 2023.

== Gallery ==
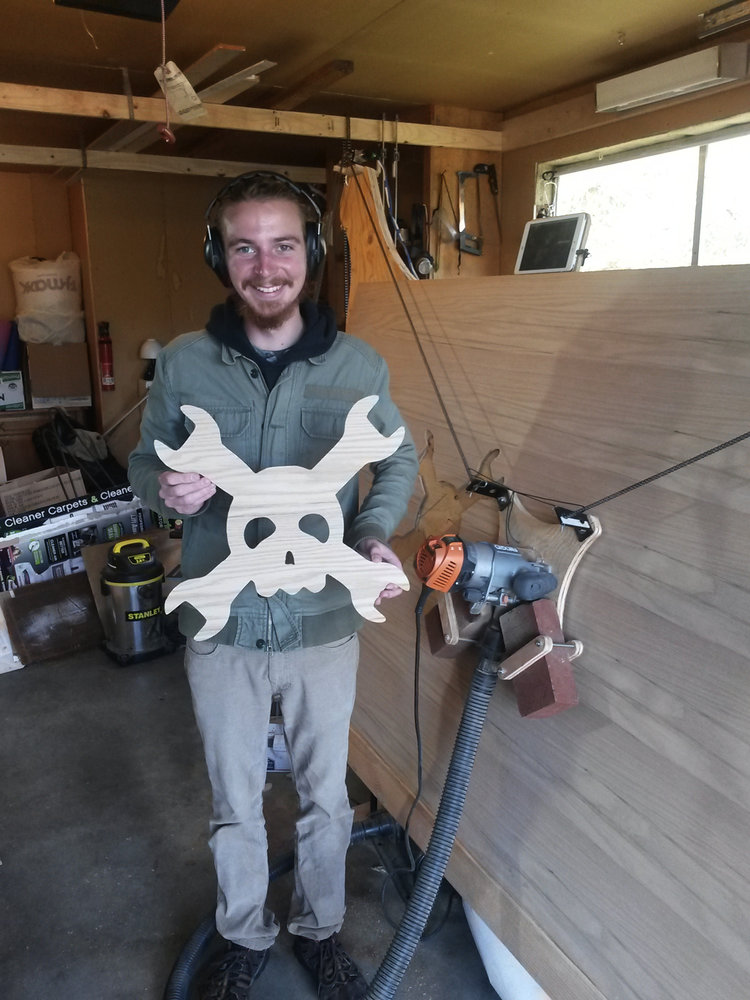
Bar Smith holding Hackaday symbol

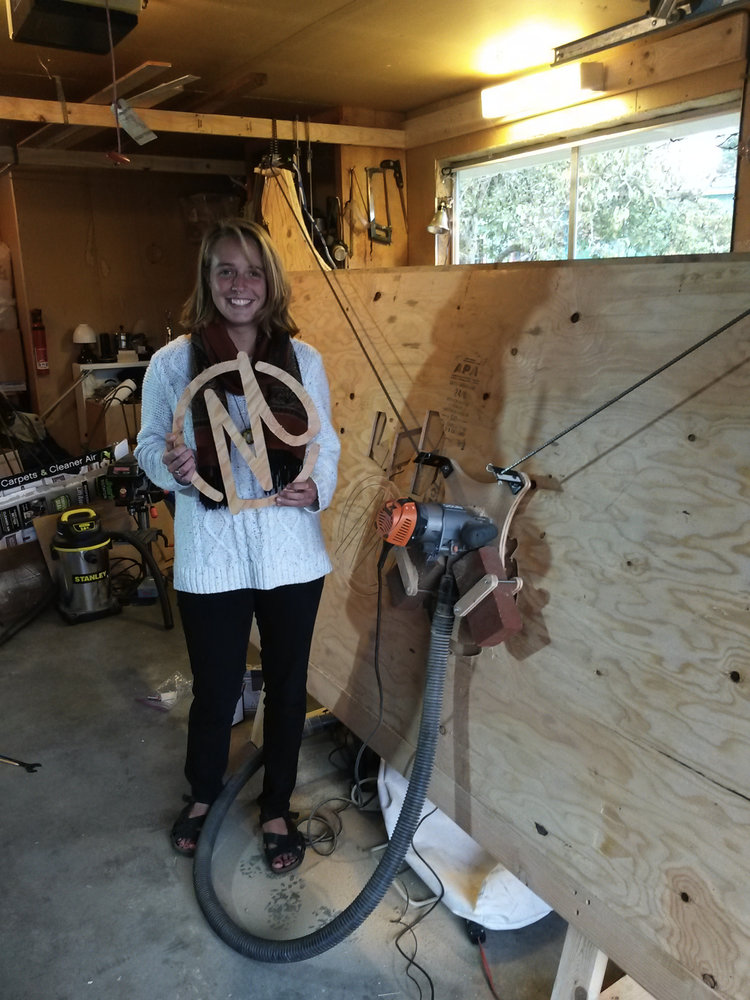
Hannah in front of Maslow CNC holding Maslow logo

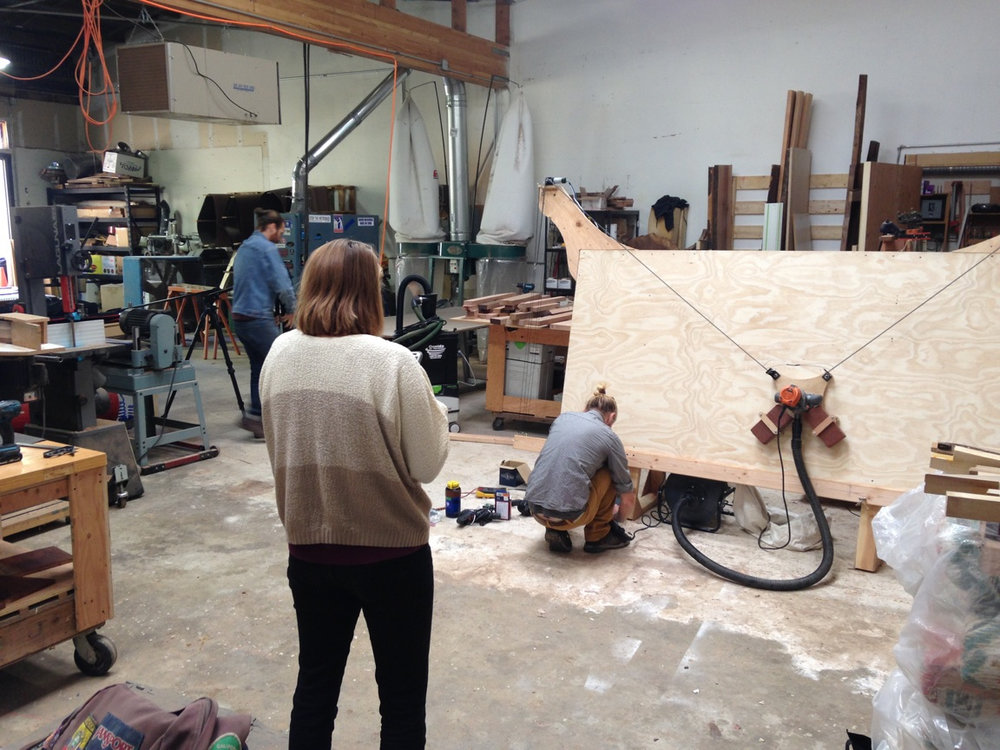
Kickstarter shoot for Maslow CNC
