= Radial force variation =

Radial force variation or road force variation (RFV) is a property of a tire that affects steering, traction, braking and load support. High values of RFV for a given tire reflect a high level of manufacturing variations in the tire structure that will impart ride disturbances into the vehicle in the vertical direction. RFV is measured according to processes specified by the ASTM International in ASTM F1806 – Standard Practice for Tire Testing.

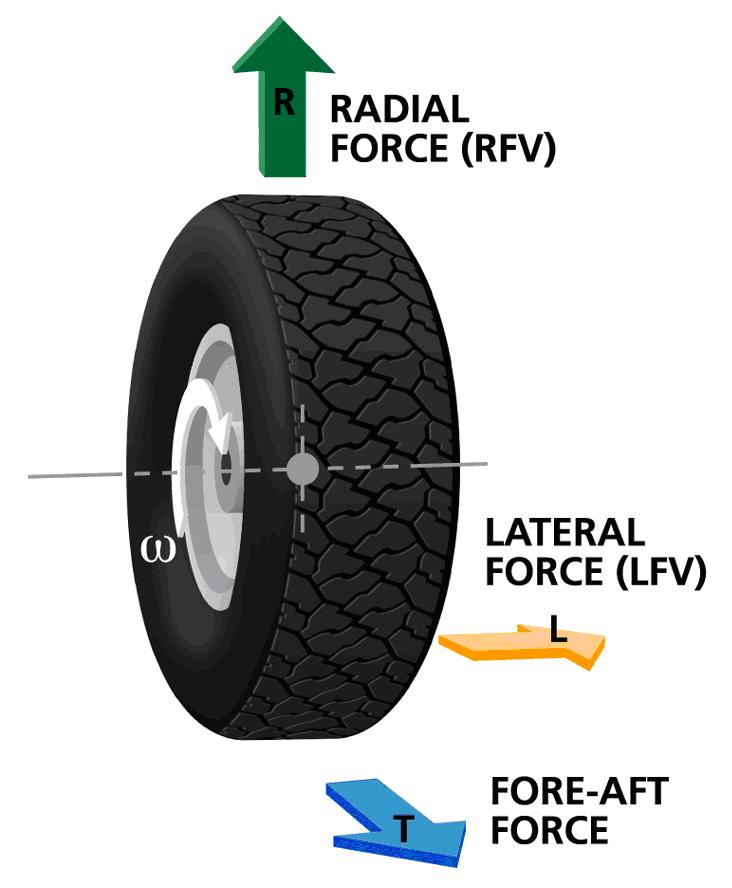
Force Variation Axes

== Explanation ==
RFV can best be explained by example. Assume a perfectly uniform tire mounted on a perfectly round wheel loaded with a constant force against a perfectly round test wheel. As the wheel turns, it turns the tire, and the tire carcass undergoes repeated deformation and recovery as it enters and exits the contact area. If we measure the radial force between the tire and the wheel we will see zero change as the tire turns. If we now test a typical production tire we will see the radial force vary as the tire turns. This variation will be induced by two primary mechanisms, variation in the thickness of the tire, and variation in the elastomeric properties of the tire.

Consider a good tire with RFV of 6 pounds (27 N). This tire will induce a 6-pound force upward into the vehicle every rotation. The frequency of the force will increase in direct proportion to rotating speed. Tire makers test tires at the point of manufacture to verify that the RFV is within allowable quality limits. Tires that exceed these limits may be scrapped or sold to markets that do not require stringent quality.

== Spring model ==
RFV is often explained by modelling the tire as being a ring composed of short compression springs. As the tire turns a spring element makes contact with the road and is compressed. As the spring rotates out of the contact area it recovers to its original length. In practice, these springs have slight differences in their lengths and spring constants. These variations result in RFV.

Tires are complex composite structures made of many different components that are assembled on a drum and cured in a mold. As a result, there are many conditions that result in RFV. These include variations in: tread extrusion thickness and symmetry, tread splice, body ply splices, inner liner splice, bead symmetry, turn-up symmetry, building drum alignment, transfer ring alignment, curing press bead seating, shaping bladder alignment and control, mold runout, and mold alignment. All of these factors can lead to variations in the material distribution and thickness that are modelled as spring length. The various tire components also are made from different materials, each of which exhibit variation in their elastic properties. These variations are influenced by rubber viscoelastic properties, mixing dispersion and uniformity, and cure heat history, among other things.

== Waveform analysis ==
RFV is a complex waveform. It is expressed using several standard methods, including peak-to-peak, first harmonic, second harmonic, and higher-order harmonics. In production RFV testing these are reported as both magnitudes and angles.
