= CNC plunge milling =

CNC milling process

CNC plunge milling, also called z-axis milling, is a CNC milling process. In this process, the feed is provided linearly along the tool axis while doing CNC processing.

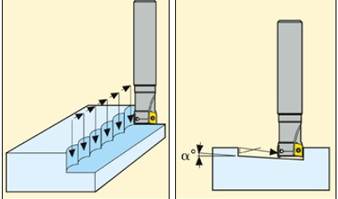
This image shows the material removal in plunge milling.

Plunge milling is effective for the rough machining process of complex shape or free form shapes like impeller parts. In multi axis plunge milling, the optimization of plunge cutter section selection and generating the tool path for free form surface is very important to improve the efficiency and effectiveness.

In plunge milling, after each plunge the milling cutter is offset by some value and then the material surface is removed in the form of lunula. The material removal rate is computed by area of lunula and the feed rate. At the entry and exit of milling cutter, the radial offset has not any influence on the condition of surface.

At the maximum cutting velocity, the surface obtained is clean whatever the feed rate per tooth on entry but on exit the high value of feed rate gives the deteriorated surface. The surface roughness value always increases with feed rate in plunge milling. The simulation of dynamic uncut chip thickness which is generated by plunge milling can be done by tracking the position of plunge cutter center. This simulation shows the regenerative effect with variation of phase difference.

Then the model of uncut chip thickness and cutting force coefficient with cutting edge radius are entered into time domain model. Finally, with the help of time domain solution the stability of machine and vibrations are estimated. The cutting parameters play a key role in plunge milling. The cutting force and machine stability both are influenced by machining parameters. Frequency domain model can be used to estimate the machining stability.

== Advantages of CNC plunge milling ==
The plunge milling has following advantage over conventional milling-

1. The radial cutting forces, which is responsible for the deformation of the tool and the workpiece, is very small.
2. The material which is difficult to cut can be rough machined easily.
3. Comparing to conventional milling, in CNC plunge milling the feed per tooth is less.
4. The vibration can be avoided in the machine so that is why it is suitable for deep cavity machining like mould and cavity making. In deep milling, the overhang of large length tool is also adjusted.

== See also ==
- CNC machining
- Milling (machining)
