= Touch probe =

Device for measuring the geometry of objects

Touch probes are tools used for precision measurements in CNC (Computer Numerical Control) machining processes. They work in a way similar to Coordinate-measuring devices. Probes are used to adjust different offsets when setting up a machining job. They can help make adjustments to tool lengths, diameter and length offsets as well as measuring various other workpiece dimensions. Probing systems can significantly reduce the time required for tool changes and adjustments in work-holding setups, and can streamline manufacturing processes.

== Usage and Types ==
The capability for accurate and automatic measurements provided by touch probes is an important part of setting up unmanned operations in modern manufacturing environments. Touch probes differ from a standalone coordinate-measuring machine in that they are typically used on the machine cutting materials. While commonly used in milling machines with automatic tool change systems, touch probes can also be manually swapped with cutting tools and are often paired with a CNC Milling Tool Height Setter for optimized performance.

=== Types ===
- Touch Probes - A sensor used to measure coordinates on a machine.
- Tool Length Sensor - A sensor used to set tool length offsets after a tool change.

=== Operation ===
In CNC machining, when something has been partially machined and needs more operations performed in a different position, it can be difficult to position the machine and restart operations in a needed location of the modified coordinates. For example, something needs to be flipped over to be machined on the opposite side. In this case, a probe can be put into the tool holder and programmed with G-code or other methods to touch off the work-piece, telling the machine where everything now is. After the machine knows everything's location, offsets are adjusted to start the next operation after the probe has been removed from the tool holder.

The technology reduces manual measurement errors and also improves machining accuracy, speeds up the setup process, and enables more sophisticated and precise manufacturing capabilities.

== History ==
The development of precision probes dates back to the 1920s with different mechanical touch devices, but significant advancements came with the advent of Coordinate Measuring Machines (CMM) in the late 1950s. This led to the creation of contact and non-contact probes, including mechanical triggers and scanning probes, as well as laser and optical video probes. Mechanical probes, the earliest form of precision measurement tools, rely on direct contact for measuring and are now rarely used due to their lower precision. Trigger probes, popularized by Renishaw in the 1970s, utilize pulse signals to determine contact point coordinates, offering precise measurements.
