= Post processor =

Component of CNC software

A post processor, also known simply as a post, is a computer program which converts tool path data from CNC software into machine tool data, to be used in CAM systems. A post processor generates the G-code used by the machine control module. The generated code will differ for each G-code dialect the post-processor supports, and will often be customized to match the limitations of the machine. Post processors can be either open- or closed-source software; closed-source posts are usually created by CAM vendors, while open-source ones are made by the community or home users. It can be difficult, however, to custom-write post-processors, as the code syntax used by the machine often varies; several efforts have been made to create a standard language.

Post-processors can be generic (being programmed for one machine) machine-specific, or custom-built. Post processors can also be used to auto-create pocket routines or, in specific cases, run robots using G-code instructions.

== See also ==
- Preprocessor
- Transpiler
- PostCSS
