= Automatic tool changer =

Part of a CNC machine which changes and stores the tool bits

In machining, an automatic tool changer (ATC) is used in computerized numerical control (CNC) machine tools to improve the production and tool carrying capacity of the machine. ATCs change tools rapidly, reducing non-productive time. They are generally used to improve the capacity of the machines to work with a number of tools. They are also used to change worn out or broken tools. They are one more step towards complete automation.

== Description ==
Simple CNC machines work with a single tool. Turrets can work with a large number of tools. But if even more tools are required, then an ATC is needed. The tools are stored in a magazine. This allows the machine to work with a large number of tools without operator intervention.

The main parts of an automatic tool changer are the base, the gripper arm, the tool holder, the support arm, and the tool magazines.

Although the ATC increases the reliability, speed, and accuracy of a machine, it creates more challenges compared to manual tool change. For example, the tooling used must be easy to center, be easy for the changer to grab, and there should be a simple way to provide the tool's self-disengagement. Tools used in ATC are secured in tool holders specially designed for this purpose.

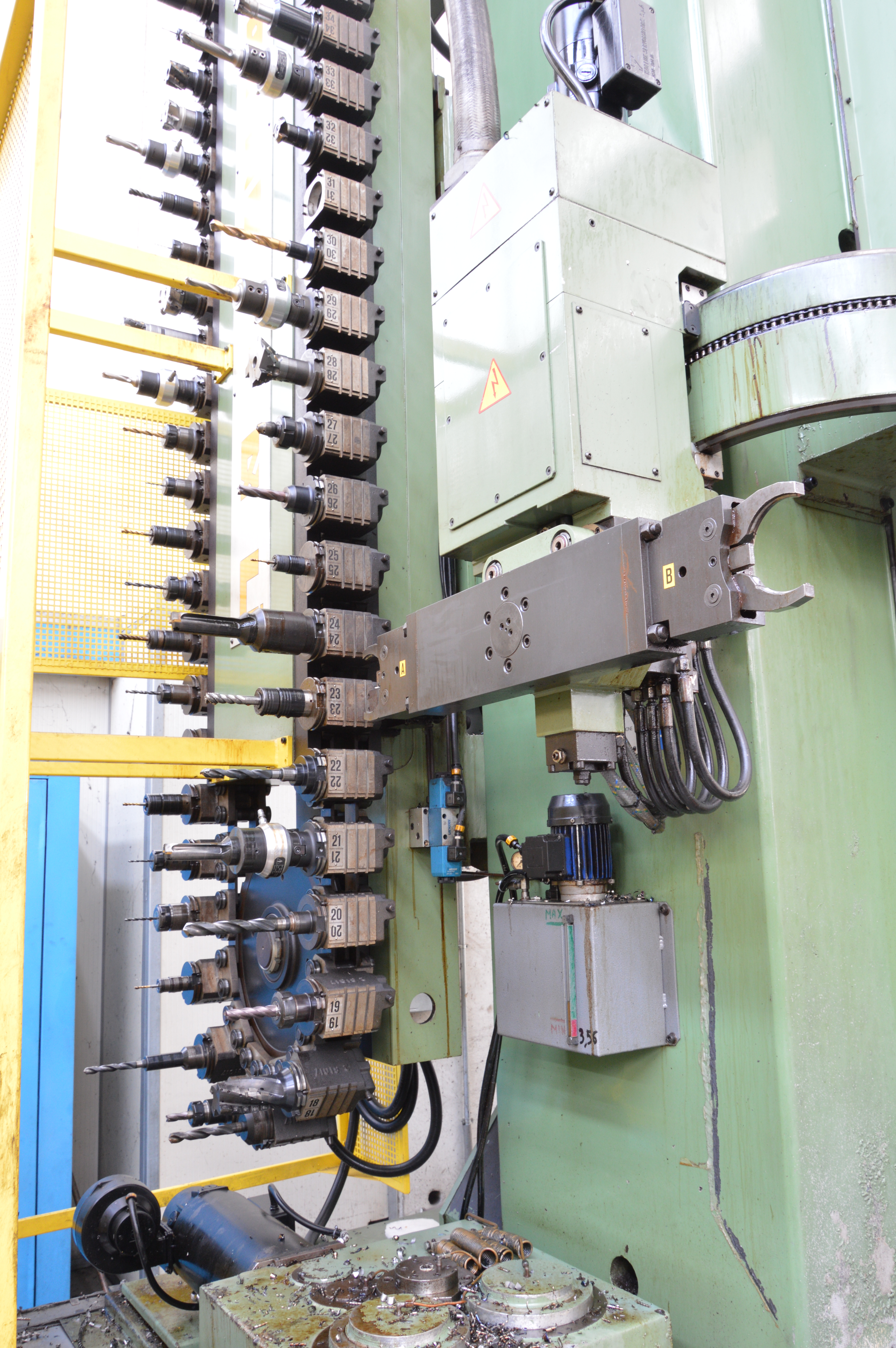
A chain-type automatic tool changer with swiveling arm and two grippers, installed on a mill

== Types of tool changers ==
Depending on the shape of the magazine, an ATC can be of two types: 1) Drum Type changers are used when the number of tools is lower than 30. The tools are stored on the periphery of the drum. 2) Chain type changers are used when the number of tools is higher than 30 (The number is different depending on the design and manufacturer. The number of tools for the drum type is fewer than the chain type). But the tool search speed will be lower in this case.

== Automatic tool changer mechanism ==
After receiving the tool change command, the tool to be changed will assume a fixed position known as the "tool change position". The ATC arm comes to this position and picks up the tool. The arm swivels between the machine turret and the magazine. It will have one gripper on each of the two sides. Each gripper can rotate 90°, to deliver tools to the front face of the turret. One will pick up the old tool from the turret and the other will pick up the new tool from the magazine. It then rotates 180° and places the tools into their needed position.

== Tool changers on sheet metal working machinery ==
ATCs were first used on chip-removal machines, such as mills and lathes. Systems for automatic rearrangement of tools have also been used on sheet metal working machinery. Panel benders have an integrated CNC-controlled device that allows punches to be moved according to the size of the part. Automated tool changes on press brakes were limited to machines integrated on a robotic bending cell. Typically a 6-axis robot used for handling sheet metal blanks is also in charge of changing punches and dies between different batches.

Since the 2020s automatic tool changers have appeared on non-robotic press brakes. The most common configuration is a tool rack on the side of the press brakes, with a shuttle picking up tools and positioning them where needed. This reduces physical strain on the operator and increases overall productivity.

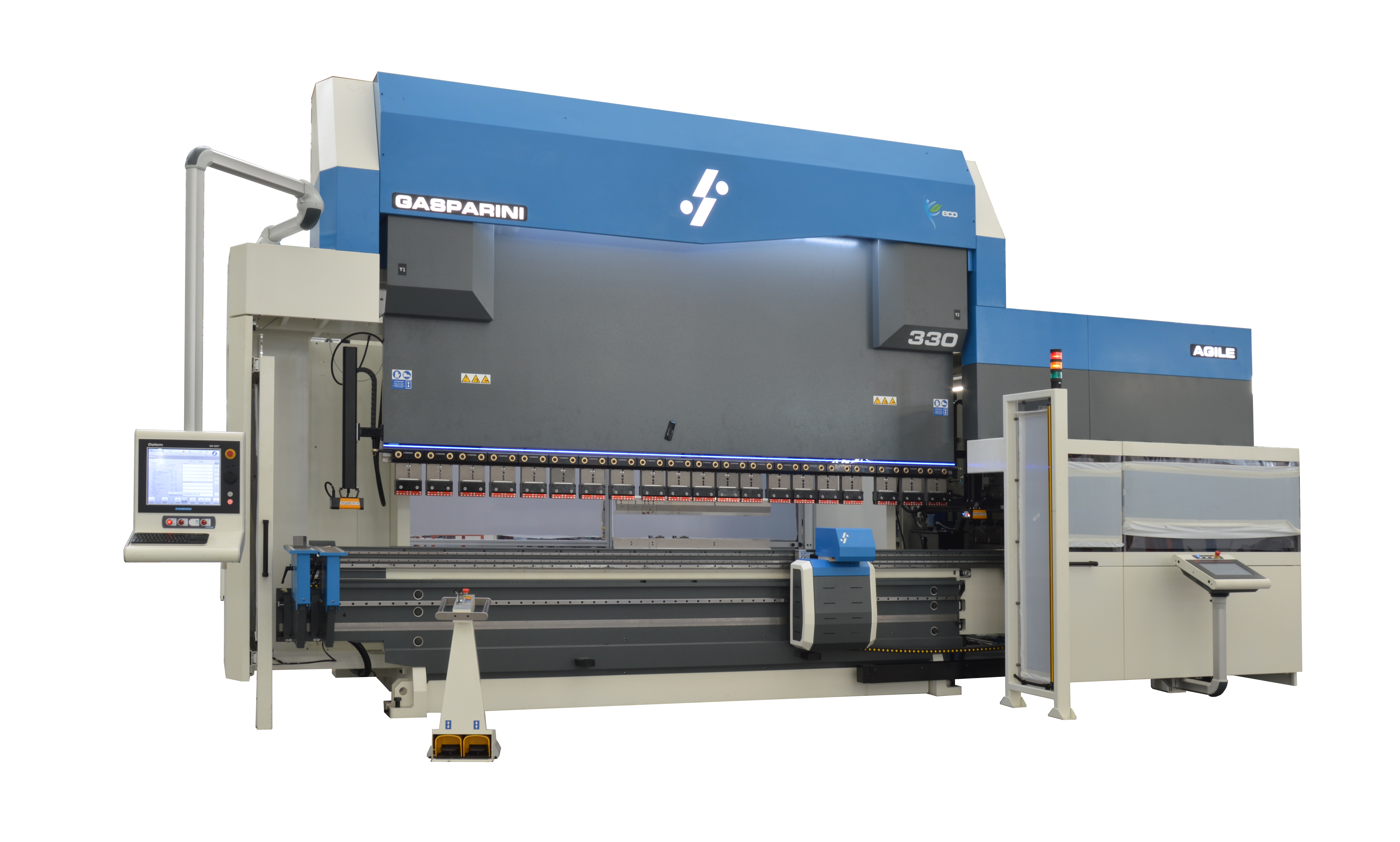
An Automatic Tool Changer for press brakes, used to set up, rearrange, and remove punches and dies. Tooling is stored in a motorized tool rack (right) and is placed in the desired position by the shuttle (blue/grey/white on center).

== Functions of a tool changer ==
The use of automatic changers increases the productive time and reduces unproductive time. It provides the storage of the tools which are returned automatically to the machine tool after carrying out the required operations, increases the flexibility of the machine tool, makes it easier to change heavy and large tools, and permits the automatic renewal of cutting edges.

== See also ==
- Automation
- Numerical control
