= Computer numerical control =

Computer control of machine tools

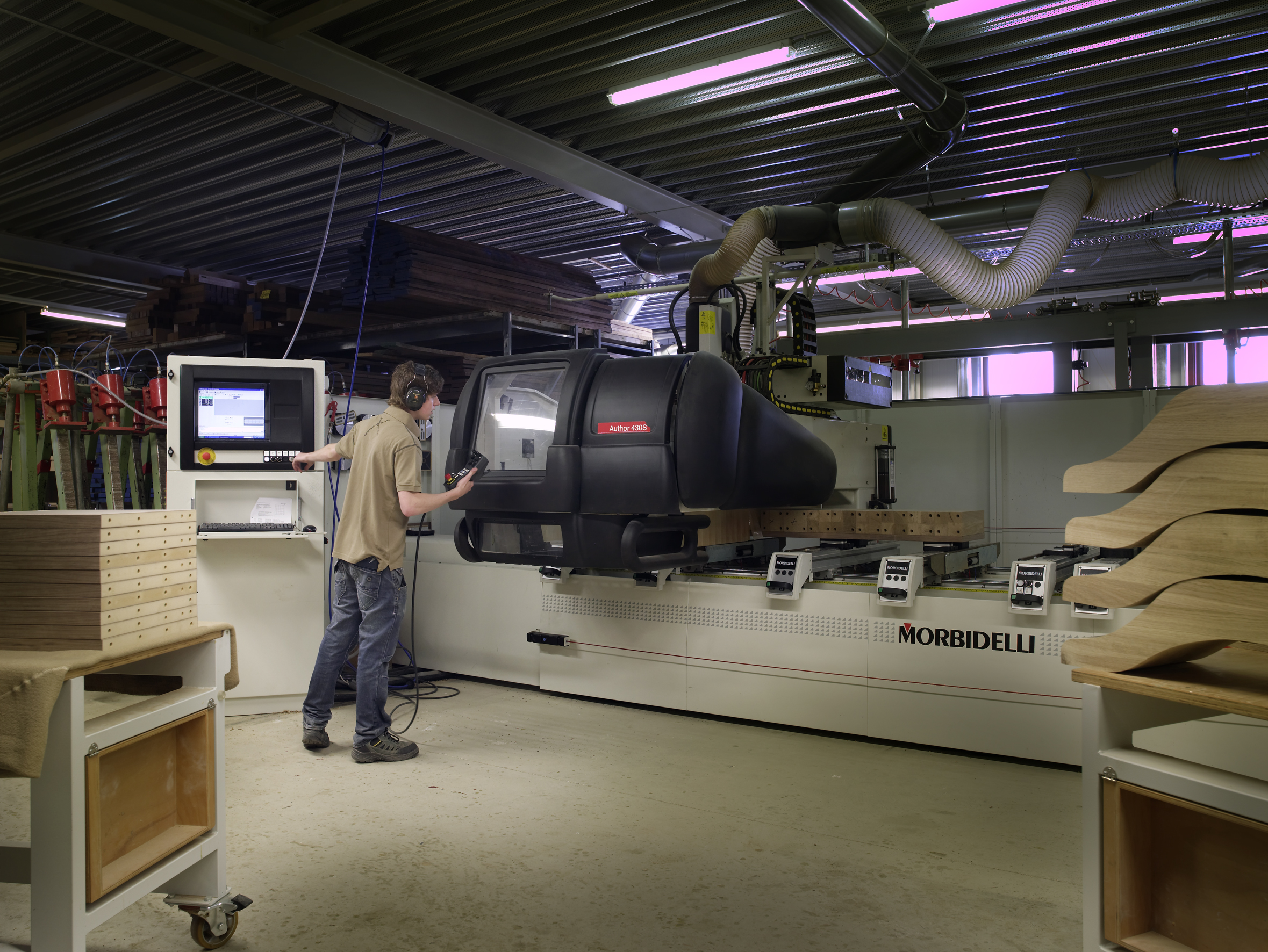
A CNC machine that operates on wood

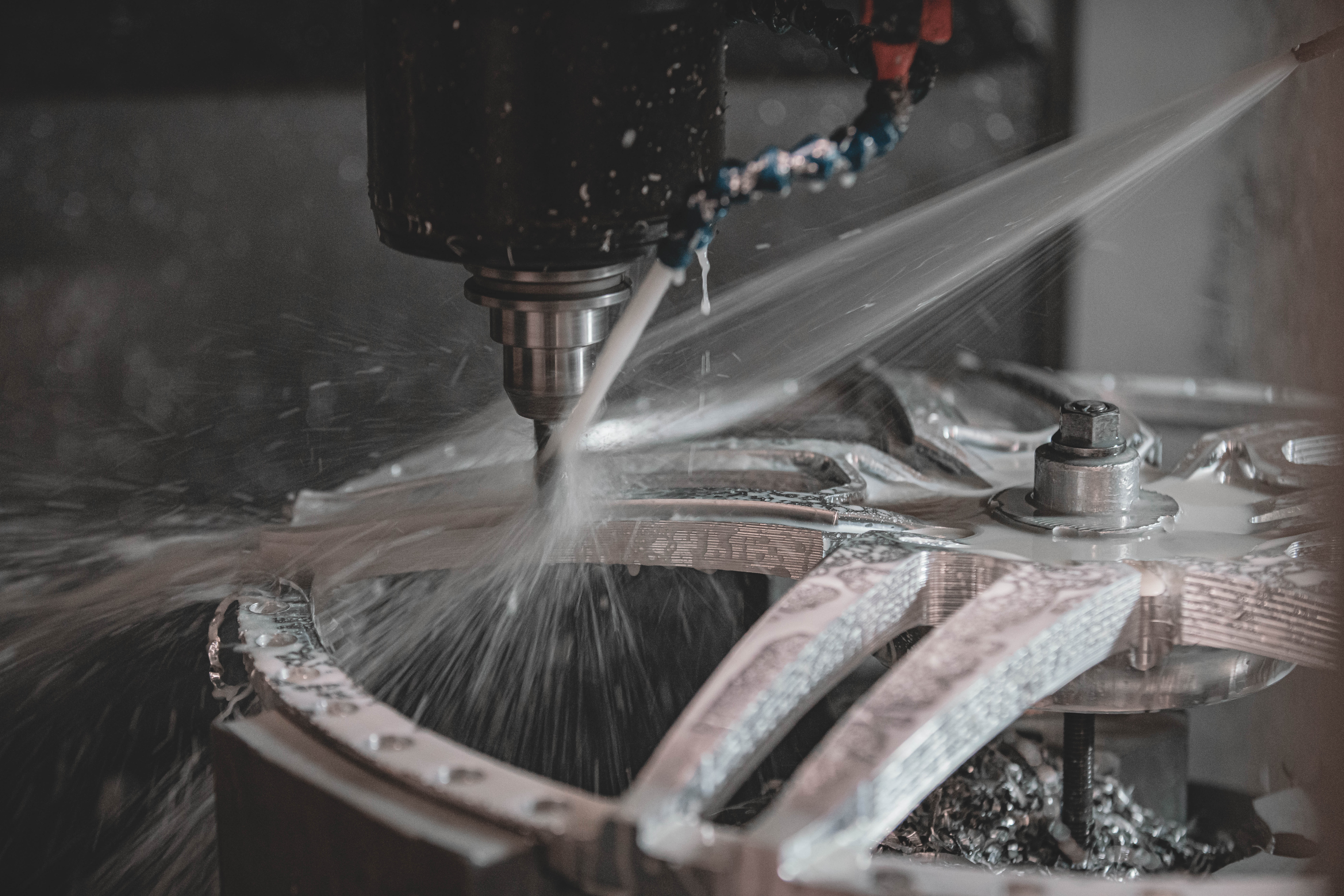
CNC machines typically use some kind of coolant, such as a water-miscible oil, to keep the tool and parts from getting hot.

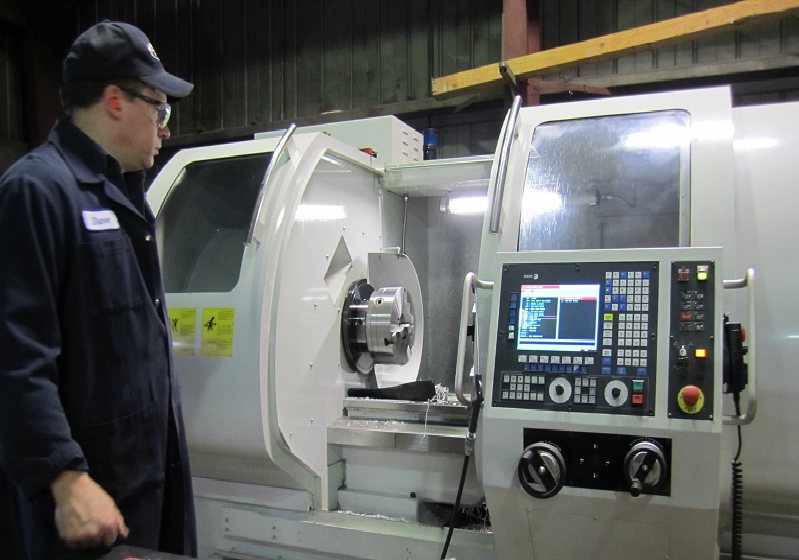
A CNC metal lathe with the door open.

Computer numerical control (CNC) or CNC machining is the automated control of machine tools by a computer. It is an evolution of numerical control (NC), where machine tools are directly managed by data storage media such as punched cards or punched tape. Because CNC allows for easier programming, modification, and real-time adjustments, it has gradually replaced NC as computing costs declined.

== History ==
The birth of NC is generally credited to John T. Parsons and Frank L. Stulen, working out of Parsons Corp. of Traverse City, Michigan. For this contribution, they were jointly awarded the National Medal of Technology and Innovation in 1985 for "Revolutioniz[ing] Production Of Cars And Airplanes With Numerical Controls For Machines".

== Effect on manufacturing ==
CNC machining fundamentally revolutionized the manufacturing industry, shifting it from manual and labor-intensive to highly automated and precision-driven. Human errors and waste were eliminated, repeatability was perfected, operations became 24/7, production steps were reduced, complex operations could be standardized and rapid prototyping became possible. Labor costs were lowered, safety was improved, overhead costs equalized and reduced inventory requirements.

Using CNC with CAD/CAM transformed how products are designed, built and scaled.

== Operation ==
A CNC machine is a motorized maneuverable tool and often a motorized maneuverable platform, which are both controlled by a computer, according to specific input instructions. Instructions are delivered to a CNC machine in the form of a sequential program of machine control instructions such as G-code and M-code, and then executed. The program can be written by a person or, far more often, generated by graphical computer-aided design (CAD) or computer-aided manufacturing (CAM) software. In the case of 3D printers, the part to be printed is cross-sectioned into virtual "slices" before the instructions (or the program) are generated. 3D printers also use G-Code.

CNC offers greatly increased productivity over non-computerized machining for repetitive production, where the machine must be manually controlled (e.g. using devices such as hand wheels or levers) or mechanically controlled by pre-fabricated pattern guides (see pantograph mill). However, these advantages come at significant cost in terms of both capital expenditure and job setup time. For some prototyping and small batch jobs, a good machine operator can have parts finished to a high standard whilst a CNC workflow is still in setup.

In modern CNC systems, the design of a mechanical part and its manufacturing program are highly automated. The part's mechanical dimensions are defined using CAD software and then translated into manufacturing directives by CAM software. The resulting directives are transformed (by "post processor" software) into the specific commands necessary for a particular machine to produce the component and then are loaded into the CNC machine.

Since any particular component might require the use of several different tools – drills, saws, touch probes etc. – modern machines often combine multiple tools into a single "cell". In other installations, several different machines are used with an external controller and human or robotic operators that move the component from machine to machine. In either case, the series of steps needed to produce any part is highly automated and produces a part that meets every specification in the original CAD drawing, where each specification includes a tolerance.

== Description ==
=== Positioning control system ===
In numerical control systems, the position of the tool is defined by a set of instructions called the part program. Positioning control is handled using either an open-loop or a closed-loop system. In an open-loop system, communication takes place in one direction only: from the controller to the motor. In a closed-loop system, feedback is provided to the controller so that it can correct for errors in position, velocity, and acceleration, which can arise due to variations in load or temperature. Open-loop systems are generally cheaper but less accurate. Stepper motors can be used in both types of systems, while servo motors can only be used in closed systems.

Motion is controlling multiple axes, normally at least two (X and Y), and a tool spindle that moves in the Z (depth). The position of the tool is driven by direct-drive stepper motors or servo motors to provide highly accurate movements, or in older designs, motors through a series of step-down gears. Open-loop control works as long as the forces are kept small enough and speeds are not too great. On commercial metalworking machines, closed-loop controls are standard and required to provide the accuracy, speed, and repeatability demanded.

=== Cartesian coordinates ===
The G & M code positions are all based on a three-dimensional Cartesian coordinate system. This system is a typical plane often seen in mathematics when graphing. This system is required to map out the machine tool paths and any other kind of actions that need to happen in a specific coordinate. Absolute coordinates are what are generally used more commonly for machines and represent the (0,0,0) point on the plane. This point is set on the stock material to give a starting point or "home position" before starting the actual machining.

=== Parts description ===
As the controller hardware evolved, the mills themselves also evolved. One change has been to enclose the entire mechanism in a large box as a safety measure (with safety glass in the doors to permit the operator to monitor the machine's function), often with additional safety interlocks to ensure the operator is far enough from the working piece for safe operation. Most new CNC systems built today are 100% electronically controlled.

CNC-like systems are used for any process that can be described as movements and operations. These include laser cutting, welding, friction stir welding, ultrasonic welding, flame and plasma cutting, bending, spinning, hole-punching, pinning, gluing, fabric cutting, sewing, tape and fiber placement, routing, picking and placing, and sawing.

=== Tool/machine crashing ===
In CNC, a "crash" occurs when the machine moves in such a way that is harmful to the machine, tools, or parts being machined, sometimes resulting in bending or breakage of cutting tools, accessory clamps, vises, and fixtures, or causing damage to the machine itself by bending guide rails, breaking drive screws, or causing structural components to crack or deform under strain. A mild crash may not damage the machine or tools but may damage the part being machined so that it must be scrapped. Many CNC tools have no inherent sense of the absolute position of the table or tools when turned on. They must be manually "homed" or "zeroed" to have any reference to work from, and these limits are just for figuring out the location of the part to work with it and are no hard motion limit on the mechanism. It is often possible to drive the machine outside the physical bounds of its drive mechanism, resulting in a collision with itself or damage to the drive mechanism. Many machines implement control parameters limiting axis motion past a certain limit in addition to physical limit switches. However, these parameters can often be changed by the operator.

Many CNC tools also do not know anything about their working environment. Machines may have load sensing systems on spindle and axis drives, but some do not. They blindly follow the machining code provided and it is up to an operator to detect if a crash is either occurring or about to occur, and for the operator to manually abort the active process. Machines equipped with load sensors can stop axis or spindle movement in response to an overload condition, but this does not prevent a crash from occurring. It may only limit the damage resulting from the crash. Some crashes may not ever overload any axis or spindle drives.

If the drive system is weaker than the machine's structural integrity, then the drive system simply pushes against the obstruction, and the drive motors "slip in place". The machine tool may not detect the collision or the slipping, so for example the tool should now be at 210mm on the X-axis, but is, in fact, at 32mm where it hit the obstruction and kept slipping. All of the next tool motions will be off by −178mm on the X-axis, and all future motions are now invalid, which may result in further collisions with clamps, vises, or the machine itself. This is common in open-loop stepper systems but is not possible in closed-loop systems unless mechanical slippage between the motor and drive mechanism has occurred. Instead, in a closed-loop system, the machine will continue to attempt to move against the load until either the drive motor goes into an overload condition or a servo motor fails to get to the desired position.

Collision detection and avoidance are possible, through the use of absolute position sensors (optical encoder strips or disks) to verify that motion occurred, or torque sensors or power-draw sensors on the drive system to detect abnormal strain when the machine should just be moving and not cutting, but these are not a common component of most hobby CNC tools. Instead, most hobby CNC tools simply rely on the assumed accuracy of stepper motors that rotate a specific number of degrees in response to magnetic field changes. It is often assumed the stepper is perfectly accurate and never missteps, so tool position monitoring simply involves counting the number of pulses sent to the stepper over time. An alternate means of stepper position monitoring is usually not available, so crash or slip detection is not possible.

Commercial CNC metalworking machines use closed-loop feedback controls for axis movement. In a closed-loop system, the controller monitors the actual position of each axis with an absolute or incremental encoder. Proper control programming will reduce the possibility of a crash, but it is still up to the operator and programmer to ensure that the machine is operated safely. However, during the 2000s and 2010s, the software for machining simulation has been maturing rapidly, and it is no longer uncommon for the entire machine tool envelope (including all axes, spindles, chucks, turrets, tool holders, tailstocks, fixtures, clamps, and stock) to be modeled accurately with 3D solid models, which allows the simulation software to predict fairly accurately whether a cycle will involve a crash. Although such simulation is not new, its accuracy and market penetration are changing considerably because of computing advancements.

=== Numerical precision and equipment backlash ===
Within the numerical systems of CNC programming, the code generator can assume that the controlled mechanism is always perfectly accurate, or that precision tolerances are identical for all cutting or movement directions. While the common use of ball screws on most modern NC machines eliminates the vast majority of backlash, it still must be taken into account. CNC tools with a large amount of mechanical backlash can still be highly precise if the drive or cutting mechanism is only driven to apply cutting force from one direction, and all driving systems are pressed tightly together in that one cutting direction. However, a CNC device with high backlash and a dull cutting tool can lead to cutter chatter and possible workpiece gouging. The backlash also affects the precision of some operations involving axis movement reversals during cutting, such as the milling of a circle, where axis motion is sinusoidal. However, this can be compensated for if the amount of backlash is precisely known by linear encoders or manual measurement.

The high backlash mechanism itself is not necessarily relied on to be repeatedly precise for the cutting process, but some other reference object or precision surface may be used to zero the mechanism, by tightly applying pressure against the reference and setting that as the zero references for all following CNC-encoded motions. This is similar to the manual machine tool method of clamping a micrometer onto a reference beam and adjusting the Vernier dial to zero using that object as the reference.

== Coding ==
=== G-codes ===
G-codes are used to command specific movements of the machine, such as machine moves or drilling functions. The majority of G-code programs start with a percent (%) symbol on the first line, then followed by an "O" with a numerical name for the program (i.e. "O0001") on the second line, then another percent (%) symbol on the last line of the program. The format for a G-code is the letter G followed by two to three digits; for example G01. G-codes differ slightly between a mill and lathe application, for example:

[G00 Rapid Motion Positioning]
[G01 Linear Interpolation Motion]
[G02 Circular Interpolation Motion-Clockwise]
[G03 Circular Interpolation Motion-Counter Clockwise]
[G04 Dwell (Group 00) Mill]
[G10 Set offsets (Group 00) Mill]
[G12 Circular Pocketing-Clockwise]
[G13 Circular Pocketing-Counter Clockwise]

=== M-codes ===
[Code Miscellaneous Functions (M-Code)]. M-codes are miscellaneous machine commands that do not command axis motion. The format for an M-code is the letter M followed by two to three digits; for example:

[M01 Operational stop]
[M02 End of Program]
[M03 Start Spindle - Clockwise]
[M04 Start Spindle - Counter Clockwise]
[M05 Stop Spindle]
[M06 Tool Change]
[M07 Coolant on mist coolant]
[M08 Flood coolant on]
[M09 Coolant off]
[M10 Chuck open]
[M11 Chuck close]
[M12 Spindle up]
[M13 BOTH M03&M08 Spindle clockwise rotation & flood coolant]
[M14 BOTH M04&M08 Spindle counter clockwise rotation & flood coolant]
[M15 BOTH M05&M09 Spindle stop and Flood coolant off]
[M16 Special tool call]
[M19 Spindle orientate]
[M29 DNC mode]
[M30 Program reset & rewind]
[M38 Door open]
[M39 Door close]
[M40 Spindle gear at middle]
[M41 Low gear select]
[M42 High gear select]
[M53 Retract Spindle] (raises tool spindle above current position to allow operator to do whatever they would need to do)
[M68 Hydraulic chuck close]
[M69 Hydraulic chuck open]
[M78 Tailstock advancing]
[M79 Tailstock reversing]

=== Coding example ===
%
O0001
G20 G40 G80 G90 G94 G54(Inch, Cutter Comp. Cancel, Deactivate all canned cycles, moves axes to machine coordinate, feed per min., origin coordinate system)
M06 T01 (Tool change to tool 1)
G43 H01 (Tool length comp. in a positive direction, length compensation for the tool)
M03 S1200 (Spindle turns CW at 1200RPM)
G00 X0. Y0. (Rapid Traverse to X=0. Y=0.)
G00 Z.5 (Rapid Traverse to z=.5)
G00 X1. Y-.75 (Rapid traverse to X1. Y-.75)
G01 Z-.1 F10 (Plunge into part at Z-.25 at 10in per min.)
G03 X.875 Y-.5 I.1875 J-.75 (CCW arc cut to X.875 Y-.5 with radius origin at I.625 J-.75)
G03 X.5 Y-.75 I0.0 J0.0 (CCW arc cut to X.5 Y-.75 with radius origin at I0.0 J0.0)
G03 X.75 Y-.9375 I0.0 J0.0(CCW arc cut to X.75 Y-.9375 with radius origin at I0.0 J0.0)
G02 X1. Y-1.25 I.75 J-1.25 (CW arc cut to X1. Y-1.25 with radius origin at I.75 J-1.25)
G02 X.75 Y-1.5625 I0.0 J0.0 (CW arc cut to X.75 Y-1.5625 with same radius origin as the previous arc)
G02 X.5 Y-1.25 I0.0 J0.0 (CW arc cut to X.5 Y-1.25 with same radius origin as the previous arc)
G00 Z.5 (Rapid traverse to z.5)
M05 (spindle stops)
G00 X0.0 Y0.0 (Mill returns to origin)
M30 (Program End)
%

Having the correct speeds and feeds in the program provides for a more efficient and smoother product run. Incorrect speeds and feeds will cause damage to the tool, machine spindle, and even the product. The quickest and simplest way to find these numbers would be to use a calculator that can be found online. A formula can also be used to calculate the proper speeds and feeds for a material. These values can be found online or in Machinery's Handbook.

== Examples of CNC machines ==
CNC machine	Description	Image
Mill	Translates programs consisting of specific numbers and letters to move the spindle (or workpiece) to various locations and depths. Can either be a Vertical Milling Center (VMC) or a Horizontal Milling Center, depending on the orientation of the spindle. Many use G-code. Functions include: face milling, shoulder milling, tapping, drilling and some even offer turning. Today, CNC mills can have three to six axes. Most CNC mills require placing the workpiece on or in them and must be at least as big as the workpiece, but new 3-axis machines are being produced that are much smaller.	
Lathe	Cuts workpieces while they are rotated. Makes fast, precision cuts, generally using indexable tools and drills. Effective for complicated programs designed to make parts that would be unfeasible to make on manual lathes. Similar control specifications to CNC mills and can often read G-code. Generally have two axes (X and Z), but newer models have more axes, allowing for more advanced jobs to be machined. Most modern lathes have live tooling, allowing for limited milling operations to take place without having to remove the part from the lathe spindle. Second operations can be completed by using a sub-spindle, which is co-axial to the main spindle, but faces the other direction. This allows the part to be removed from the main spindle, and for additional features to be machined in the back side of the part.	
Plasma cutter	Involves cutting a material using a plasma torch. Commonly used to cut steel and other metals, but can be used on a variety of materials. In this process, gas (such as compressed air) is blown at high speed out of a nozzle; at the same time, an electrical arc is formed through that gas from the nozzle to the surface being cut, turning some of that gas to plasma. The plasma is sufficiently hot to melt the material being cut and moves sufficiently fast to blow molten metal away from the cut.	CNC plasma cutting
Electric discharge machining	(EDM), also known as spark machining, spark eroding, burning, die sinking, or wire erosion, is a manufacturing process in which the desired shape is obtained using electrical discharges (sparks). Material is removed from the workpiece by a series of rapidly recurring current discharges between two electrodes, separated by a dielectric fluid and subject to an electric voltage. One of the electrodes is called the tool electrode, or simply the "tool" or "electrode", while the other is called the workpiece electrode, or "workpiece". EDM can be broadly divided into "sinker" type processes, where the electrode is the positive shape of the resulting feature in the part, and the electric discharge erodes this feature into the part, resulting in the negative shape, and "wire" type processes. Sinker processes are rather slow as compared to conventional machining, averaging on the order of 100 mm^{3}/min, as compared to 8 million mm^{3}/min for conventional machining, but it can generate features that conventional machining cannot. Wire EDM operates by using a thin conductive wire, typically brass, as the electrode, and discharging as it runs past the part being machined. This is useful for complex profiles with inside 90 degree corners that would be challenging to machine with conventional methods.	Sinker EDM. Electrolyte solution saturates the workpiece, and voltage is applied between the sinker, top, and workpiece, bottom.
Multi-spindle machine	Type of screw machine used in mass production. Considered to be highly efficient by increasing productivity through automation. Can efficiently cut materials into small pieces while simultaneously utilizing a diversified set of tooling. Multi-spindle machines have multiple spindles on a drum that rotates on a horizontal or vertical axis. The drum contains a drill head which consists of several spindles that are mounted on ball bearings and driven by gears. There are two types of attachments for these drill heads, fixed or adjustable, depending on whether the center distance of the drilling spindle needs to be varied.	
Water jet cutter	Also known as a "waterjet", is a tool capable of slicing into metal or other materials (such as granite) by using a jet of water at high velocity and pressure, on the order of 60,000 PSI, or a mixture of water and an abrasive substance, such as garnet powder. It is often used during the fabrication or manufacture of parts for machinery and other devices. Waterjet cutting is the preferred machining method when the materials being cut are sensitive to the high temperatures generated by other methods. It has found applications in a diverse number of industries from mining to aerospace where it is used for operations such as cutting, shaping, carving, and reaming. The thickness of material processable via waterjet machining is generally limited by the pressure of the waterjet, and by the dispersion of the jet as it gets further from the nozzle. Some waterjet cutters have a 5-axis cutting head, allowing for much more complex shapes to be cut, and to compensate for the angle of the kerf to leave the angled wall on the stock instead of on the finished part.	Waterjet cutting machine
Punch press	Used to rapidly punch holes and cut thin materials. Such as sheet metal, plywood, thin bar stock, and tubing. Punch presses are generally used when a CNC mill would be inefficient or unfeasible. CNC punch presses can come in the C frame, where the sheet material is clamped onto a machining table and a hydraulic ram pushes down on the material, or they can come in a portal frame variant where bar stock/tubing is fed into the machine.	Punch machine at work

== Other CNC tools ==
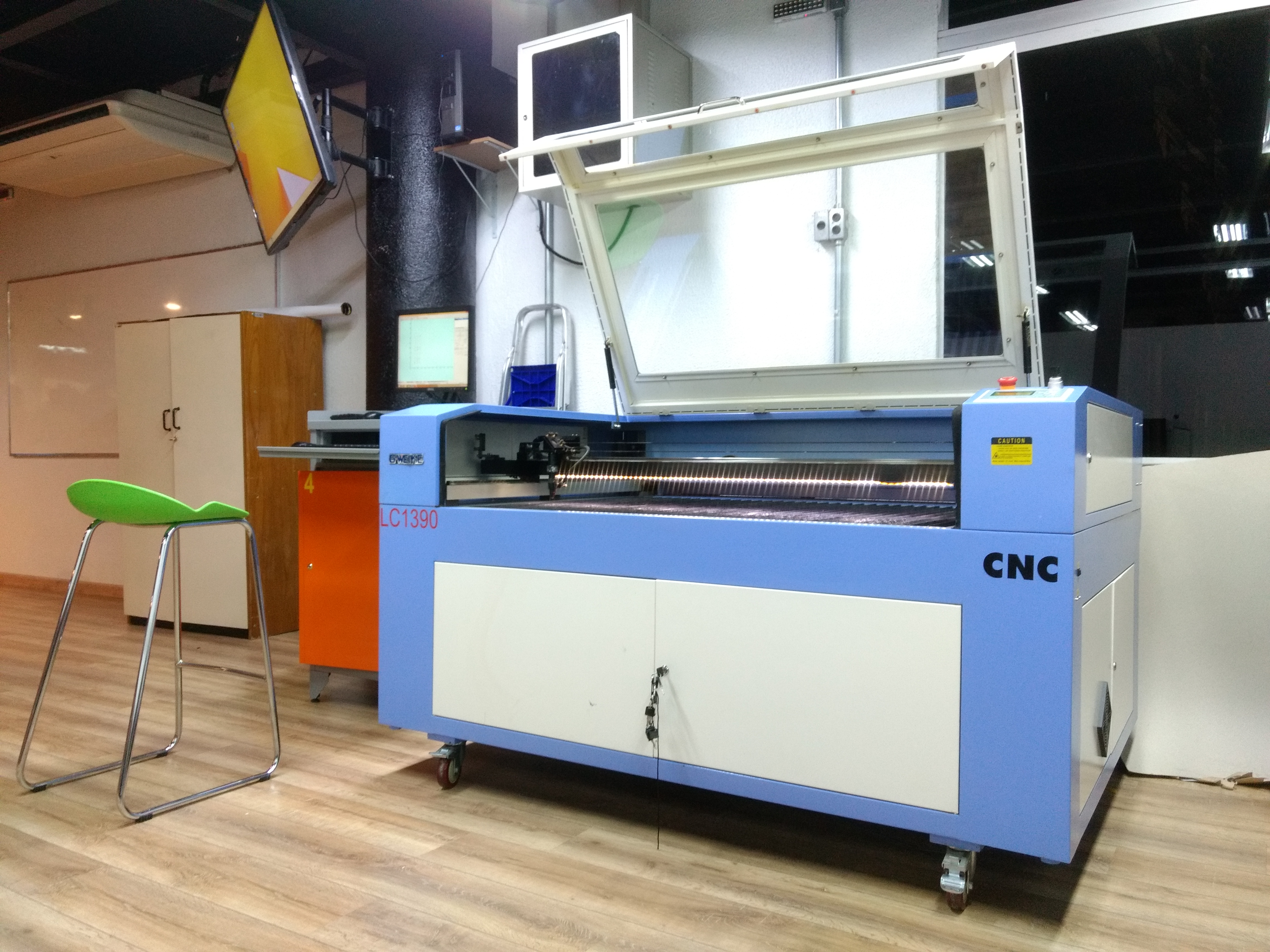
Laser cutter at a fab lab

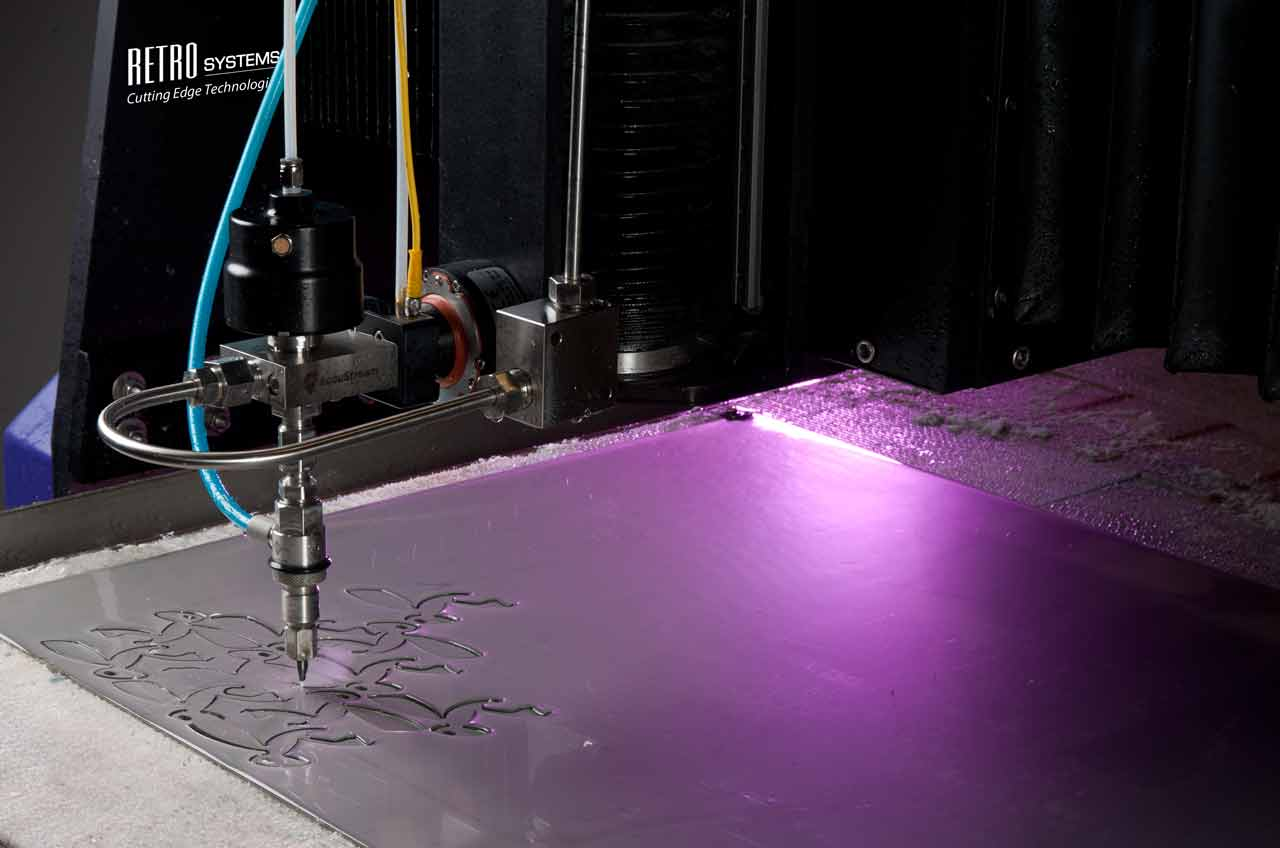
Water jet cutter

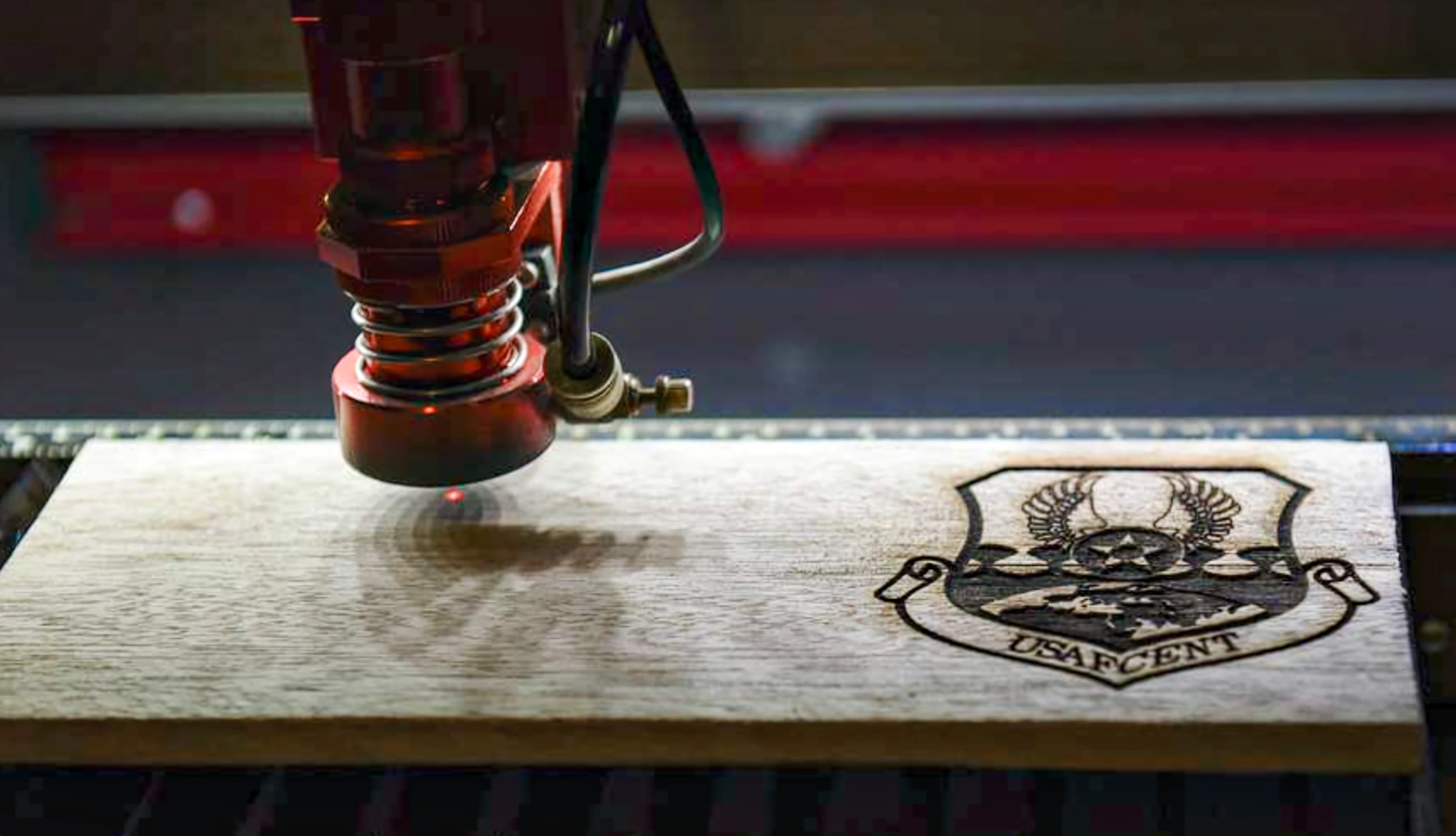
Laser engraved wood

Many other tools have CNC variants, including:

- 3D printing
- CNC riveting
- CNC router
- Cylindrical grinders
- Drills
- Embroidery machines
- Glass cutting
- Hot-wire foam cutters
- Induction hardening machines
- Laser cutting
- Laser engraving
- Lathes
- Leather cutter
- Milling machine
- Oxy-fuel
- Plasma cutters
- Sheet metal works (Turret punch)
- Submerged arc welding
- Surface grinder
- Tube, pipe and wire bending machines
- Vinyl cutter
- Water jet cutters
- Wood routers

== History ==
=== 1940s to 1950s ===
The first NC machines were built in the 1940s and 1950s, based on existing tools that were modified with motors that moved the tool or part to follow points fed into the system on punched tape or magnetic tape. These early servomechanisms were rapidly augmented with analog and digital computers, creating the modern CNC machine tools that have revolutionized machining processes.

=== 2000s ===
CNC plays an extensive role in the processing manufacturing field, not only the traditional milling and turning, other machines and equipment are also installed with the corresponding CNC, which makes the manufacturing industry in its support, greatly improving the quality and efficiency. Traditional subtractive manufacturing can be combined with additive manufacturing (3D printing) to create a new manufacturing method - hybrid additive subtractive manufacturing (HASM). Another trend is the combination of AI, using a large number of sensors, with the goal of achieving flexible manufacturing.

== See also ==
- Automatic tool changer
- Binary cutter location
- CNC plunge milling
- Computer-aided technologies
  - Computer-aided engineering (CAE)
- Coordinate-measuring machine (CMM)
- Design for manufacturability
- Direct numerical control (DNC)
- EIA RS-274
- Gerber format
- Home automation
- Maslow CNC
- Multiaxis machining
- Optical tracer
- Part program
- Robotics
- Touch probe
- List of computer-aided manufacturing software
- List of 3D printing software
