= Turret punch =

Type of punch press

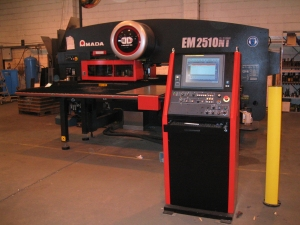
Amada turret punch press

A turret punch or turret press is a type of punch press used for metal forming by punching.

Punching, and press work in general, is a process well suited to mass production. However the initial tooling costs, of both the machine and the job-specific press tool, are high. This limits punch work from being used for much small-volume and prototype work. A turret punch is one way of addressing this cost. The tooling of a turret punch uses a large number of standard punch tools: holes of varying sizes, straight edges, commonly used notches or mounting holes. By using a large number of strokes, with several different tools in turn, a turret press may make a wide variety of parts without having to first make a specialised press tool for that task. This saves both time and money, enabling rapid prototyping or for low volume production without tooling delays.

A typical CNC turret punch has a choice of up to 60 tools in a "turret" that can be rotated to bring any tool to the punching position. A simple shape (e.g., a square, circle, or hexagon) is cut directly from the sheet. A complex shape can be cut out by making many square or rounded cuts around the perimeter. As a press tool requires a matching punch and die set, there are two corresponding turrets, above and below the bed, for punch and die. These two turrets must rotate in precise synchronisation and with their alignment carefully maintained. Several punches of identical shape may be used in the turret, each one turned to a different angle, as there is usually no feature to rotate the sheet workpiece relative to the tool.

A punch is less flexible than a laser for cutting compound shapes, but faster for repetitive shapes (for example, the grille of an air-conditioning unit). Some units combine both laser and punch features in one machine.

Most turret punches are CNC-controlled, with automatic positioning of the metal sheet beneath the tool and programmed selection of particular tools. A CAM process first converts the CAD design for the finished item into the number of individual punch operations needed, depending on the tools available in the turret.

The precise load-out of tools may change according to a particular job's needs. The CAD stage is also optimised for turret punching: an operation such as rounding a corner may be much quicker with a single chamfered cut than a fully rounded corner requiring several strokes. Changing an unimportant dimension such as the width of a ventilation slot may match an available tool, requiring a single cut, rather than cutting each side separately. CAD support may also manage the selection of tools to be loaded into the turret before starting work.

As each tool in a turret press is relatively small, the press requires little power compared to a press manufacturing similar parts with a single press stroke. This allows the tool to be lighter and sometimes cheaper, although this is offset by the increased complexity of the turret and sheet positioning. Turret punches can operate faster per stroke than a heavier tool press, although of course many strokes are required. A turret punch can achieve 600 strokes per minute.

The most sophisticated recent machines may also add facilities for forming and bending, as well as punch cutting. Although unlikely to replace a press brake for box making, the ability to form even small lugs may turn a two machine process into a one machine process, reducing materials handling time.

== Manual punches ==
Manual turret punches have also been used. These are C frame presses, usually with a rack-actuated ram. There is no CNC, for either sheet positioning or tool changing. Using such a manual press requires great familiarity, as the correct tool must be selected from the turret each time for every one of the many press operations performed. Such manual presses are rarely found, but they have their place in labour-intensive tasks such as hand-worked sheetmetal shops, making such products as custom car bodywork. They are often used in conjunction with other highly skilled artisan processes such as an English wheel.
