= POC21 innovation camp =

Conference

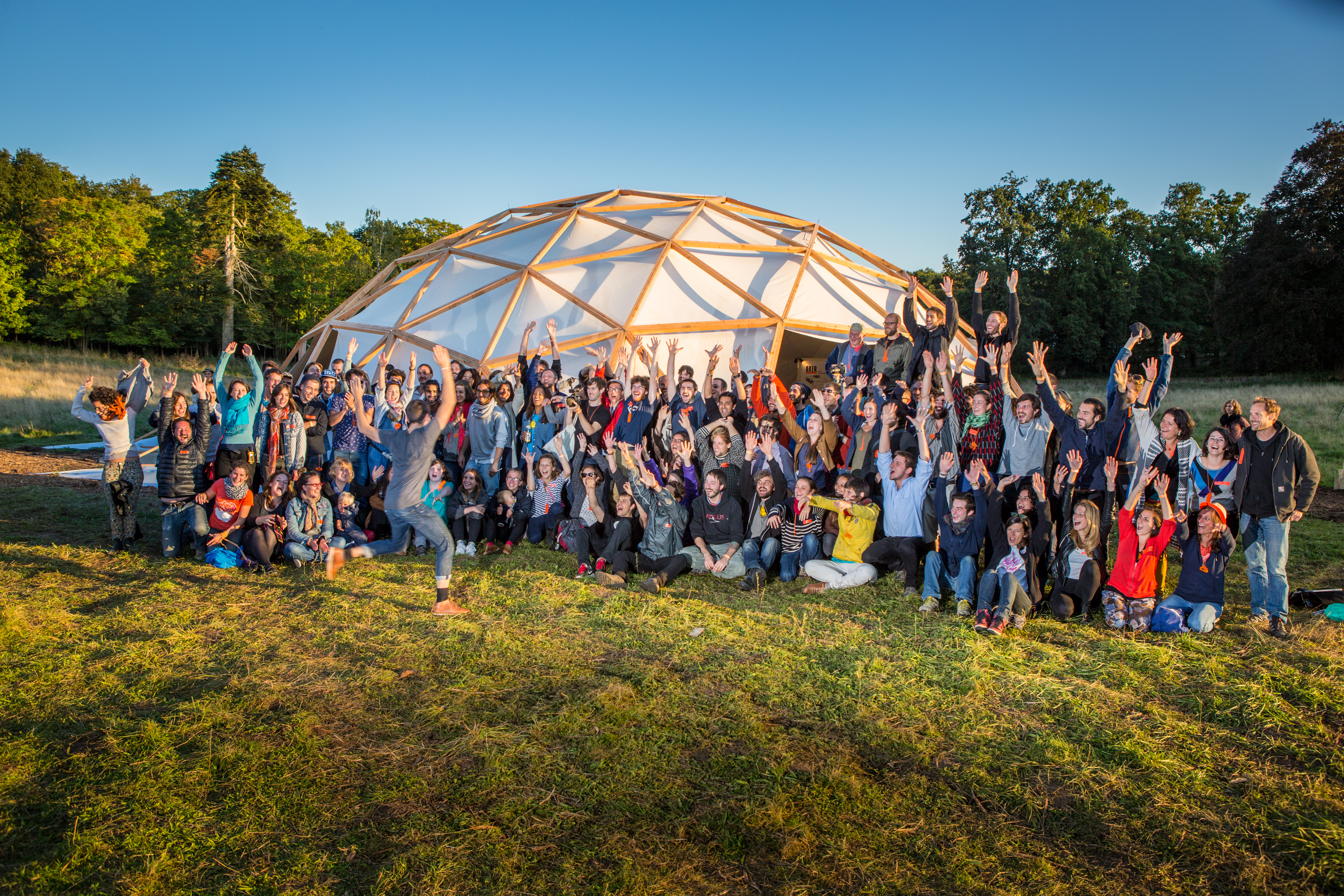
- The POC21 crew and the geodesic dome where the final exhibition took place.
- Date: August 15th - September 20th 2015
- Location: Chateau de Millemont, near Paris, France
- Type: Innovation Camp
- Theme: Open Source Technology
- Cause: Climate Change
- Budget: 1M €
- Organised by: Open State & OuiShare
- Website: www.poc21.cc

POC21 was an innovation camp that took place in Chateau de Millemont near Paris. It lasted for five weeks from August 15, 2015, until September 20, 2015. POC21 innovation camp hosted 100 makers, designers and innovators to develop a Proof of Concept of a truly sustainable society. The scope of such an innovation camp was unseen before. The 'accelerator' program developed 12 open source hardware projects from energy production and monitoring to living, mobility, communication and food production and preservation.

POC21 innovation camp was a cooperation between the German collective Open State and the French network OuiShare.

== Principles ==
POC21 innovation camp brought together the startup world, DIY scene and environmentalist ideas to show solutions to fight climate change. The main principles of POC21 innovation camp derive from sustainable design, open source and zero waste.

== Structure ==
POC21 innovation camp focused on the development of technology and on creative processes. The creative processes involved a.o. workshops, keynotes, mentoring (with a.o. Bruce Sterling and Michel Bauwens from P2P Foundation), reality checks with external business and science experts and regular retrospectives. The twelve project teams could use the knowledge and experience from 200 trainers, marketing experts, product designers and engineers to further develop their prototype in five weeks.

The camp was a temporary commune. In the five weeks of the camp a living prototype of a sustainable society was established and concepts like Coworking, Coliving, non-hierarchical structures and consensus principles were used and put into practice.

The infrastructure of Chateau de Millemont was basic with a community kitchen, compost toilets and a tent camp. The FabLab provided high tech tools, 3D printer, laser cutter and CNC machines. The camp itself was a prototype for a local micro factory.

40% of the financial budget of 1M € was donated by both business companies and foundations, 20% originated from public subsidies.

== 12 projects ==
- $30 Wind Turbine: low-cost and easy-to-build recycling solution for individual energy harvesting
- Aker: Kits for urban gardening
- Kitchen B: modular kitchen reducing energy and waste
- Bicitractor: pedal driven tractor as a fuel less alternative for big industrial machines
- Faircap: reusable water filter for bottles
- Nautile: energy saving kettle
- Open Energy Monitor: tool for visualizing domestic energy consumption
- Myfood: permaculture and aquaponics greenhouse
- SolarOSE: solar concentrator to provide thermal energy
- Showerloop: real-time shower looping system minimizing water and energy usage
- Sunzilla: modular and portable solar-powered generators to power remote areas
- Velo M2: multi-functional cargo bike capsules

All twelve projects are open source and can be built, modified and distributed. The blueprints are available online.

== Media coverage ==
From November 30 until December 12, 2015, Paris hosted the UN climate conference COP21. The POC21 innovation camp was a grassroots movement complementary to the political narrative and therefore reached an international audience and gained much critical acclaim. The media coverage was especially big in France and in Germany.

The documentary movie premiered on November 29, 2015, in Berlin and is available online.

== Events ==
The results of the POC21 innovation camp were featured on many events along the UN climate conference COP21.

- Finissage at Chateau de Millemont, September 19 & 20, 2015
- Expo Paris de L'avenir, November 18 until December 13, 2015
- COY11, November 26 until 28th 2015
- PlaceToB, November 29 until December 4, 2015
- ICI Montreuil, December 5, 2015
- Climate Action Zone, December 7 until December 11, 2015

== See also ==
- Hackathon
- FabLab
