= NMTB =

NMTB may refer to:

- Never Mind the Buzzcocks, a music-based comedy quiz programme on BBC Two and Sky One
- Never Mind the Bollocks, Here's the Sex Pistols, an album by the Sex Pistols
- Association for Manufacturing Technology, formerly the National Machine Tool Builders Association
- Machine taper#NMTB tapers a standard CNC taper, promulgated by the former National Machine Tool Builders Association
