= Strati =

Strati can refer to

- Strati (automobile), the world's first 3D printed electric car manufactured by Local Motors
- Stratus cloud

== People with surname Strati ==
- Antonio Strati (born 1949), Italian organizational theorist and artist
- Ermir Strati (born 1983), Albanian football player
- Laura Strati (born 1990), Italian female long jumper
- Saimir Strati (born 1966), Albanian mosaic artist
