= Sinumerik =

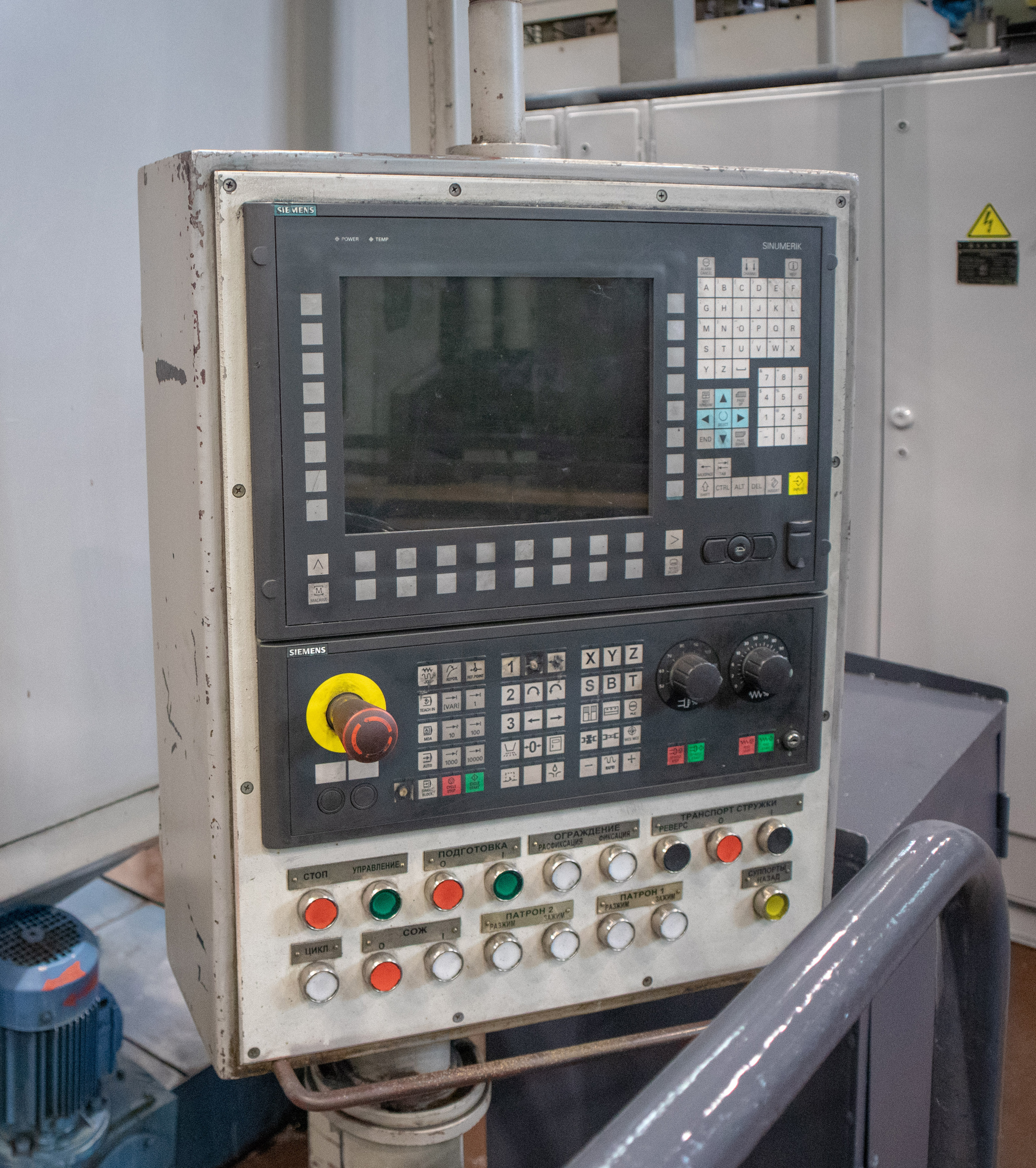
Sinumerik CNC controlling a machine tool

Sinumerik is a series of Siemens CNC (computer numerical control) control systems.

== Sinumerik System 8 ==
During the early to late 1980s the Sinumerik "System 8" used G-code to control industrial systems. The models included:

- SINUMERIK 8M/8ME
- SINUMERIK 8T/8TE
- SINUMERIK Sprint 8T/8TE
- SINUMERIK Sprint 8M/8ME
- SINUMERIK Sprint 8MC/MCE

== Sinumerik System 3 ==
In the late 1980s the models included:

- SINUMERIK 3T/3TT

== See also ==
- History of numerical control
