= Microfactory =

Small factory in capital or size

A microfactory either refers to a capital-light facility used for the local assembly of a complex product or system or a small (normally automated) factory for producing small quantities of products. The term was proposed by the Mechanical Engineer Laboratory (MEL) of Japan in 1990 and has recently been used to describe the approach of manufacturers like Local Motors and Arrival.

A microfactory can also refer to a factory designed for flexible small batch production that can produce a wide variety of products as opposed to a single monolithic mass production type approach. Typically the manufacturing processes of microfactories take advantage of digital fabrication technology such as 3D printing and CNC machines in order to accomplish this. For example, Local Motors had microfactories in Phoenix, Ariz. and Knoxville, Tenn. The company built products, like the Rally Fighter prerunner sports car, in its microfactories.

At least one proposed microfactory is being designed to make many of its own parts, i.e., a partially self-replicating machine.

== Advantages ==
The microfactory's main advantages are saving a substantial amount of space, energy, materials, time, and upfront capital costs.

Due to their reduced dimensions, microfactories are normally highly automated. They might contain automatic machine tools, assembly systems, quality inspection systems, material feed systems, waste elimination systems, a system to evaluate tool deterioration and a system to replace tools.

== See also ==
- Automation
- Numerical control
- 3D printing
- Digital modeling and fabrication
- Flexible manufacturing system
- Distributed manufacturing
- Agile manufacturing
