= Local Motors =

American motor vehicle manufacturing company

- Type: Private
- Industry: Automotive manufacturing
- Founded: 2007; 19 years ago
- Defunct: January 14, 2022; 4 years ago
- Headquarters: Phoenix, Arizona
- Key people: John B. Rogers Jr., Justin Fishkin, Vikrant Aggarwal

Local Motors was an American manufacturing company focused on low-volume production of open-source vehicles and other products using multiple microfactories. The company built a platform that combined online community co-creation with distributed digital manufacturing. It was co-founded in 2007 by John B. Rogers Jr. and had headquarters in Phoenix, Arizona. It produced the Rally Fighter (claimed to be the world’s first open-source car), the Strati (a 3D-printed car) and Olli (a 3D-printed, electric-powered, self-driving minibus).

== History ==
Local Motors was co-founded in 2007 by John B. Rogers Jr. to develop vehicles using a combination of community-based design and small-scale manufacturing. The company established its headquarters in Phoenix, Arizona, with additional microfactories in Knoxville, Las Vegas, Louisville, and Washington, DC.

In February 2017, Local Motors closed its Las Vegas location.

Local Motors closed on 14 January 2022, with their closure announced by Chris Stoner, their former VP of sales and customer success.

== Platform (co-creation + microfactories) ==
Co-creation was a technique employed by Local Motors to accelerate new product development and commercialization. Co-creation involves brands collaborating with customers to enhance products and services. Local Motors revolutionized this process through a web-based platform hosting design challenges and engineering hackathons. They partnered with companies such as Siemens to offer professional design tools like CAD to the community at affordable prices.

In addition to cocreating its own proprietary products, Local Motors partnered with select organizations to facilitate co-creation of their products, including Airbus, GE, BMW, IBM, Goodyear, Reebok, Peterbilt, DARPA, Shell, US Army, ARPA-E, and Domino's.

Local Motors' achievements in swiftly and affordably developing and bringing products to market drew interest from partners in neighboring industries eager to employ its crowdsourcing and advanced manufacturing techniques. Among these partners were companies like Airbus and GE, who, in turn, became significant investors in Local Motors.

The company’s innovative business model has been referenced widely in academia, featured in hundreds of media outlets, and is the subject of a Harvard Business School (HBS) case study. Fast Company twice included Local Motors on its list of the world’s most innovative companies. The company holds three Guinness World Records and won two Popular Mechanics Breakthrough Awards.

== Rally Fighter ==
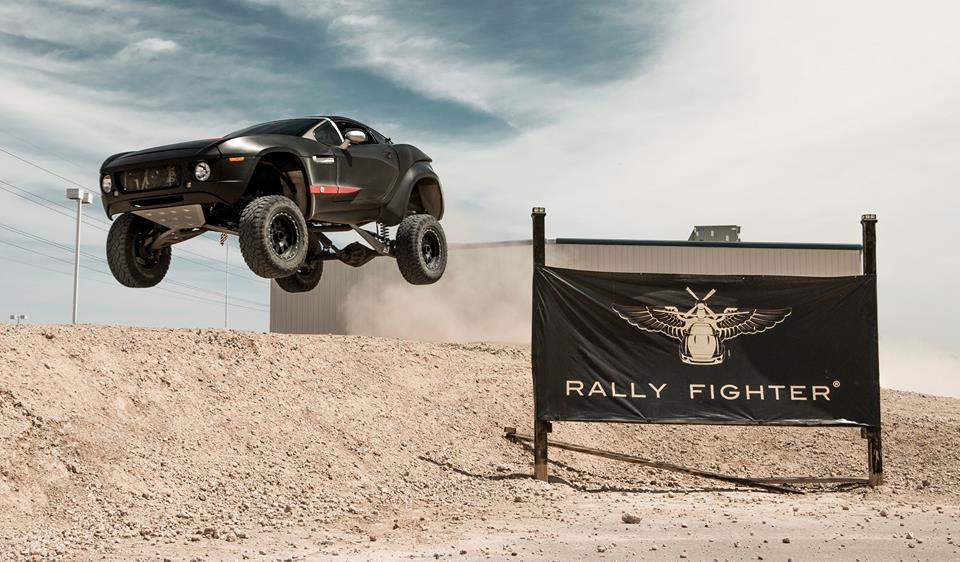
Rally Fighter at Local Motors' Phoenix microfactory

The Rally Fighter was introduced in 2009, as the first car to be developed using co-creation design. The exterior design was submitted by Sangho Kim and selected through community votes.

== Strati ==
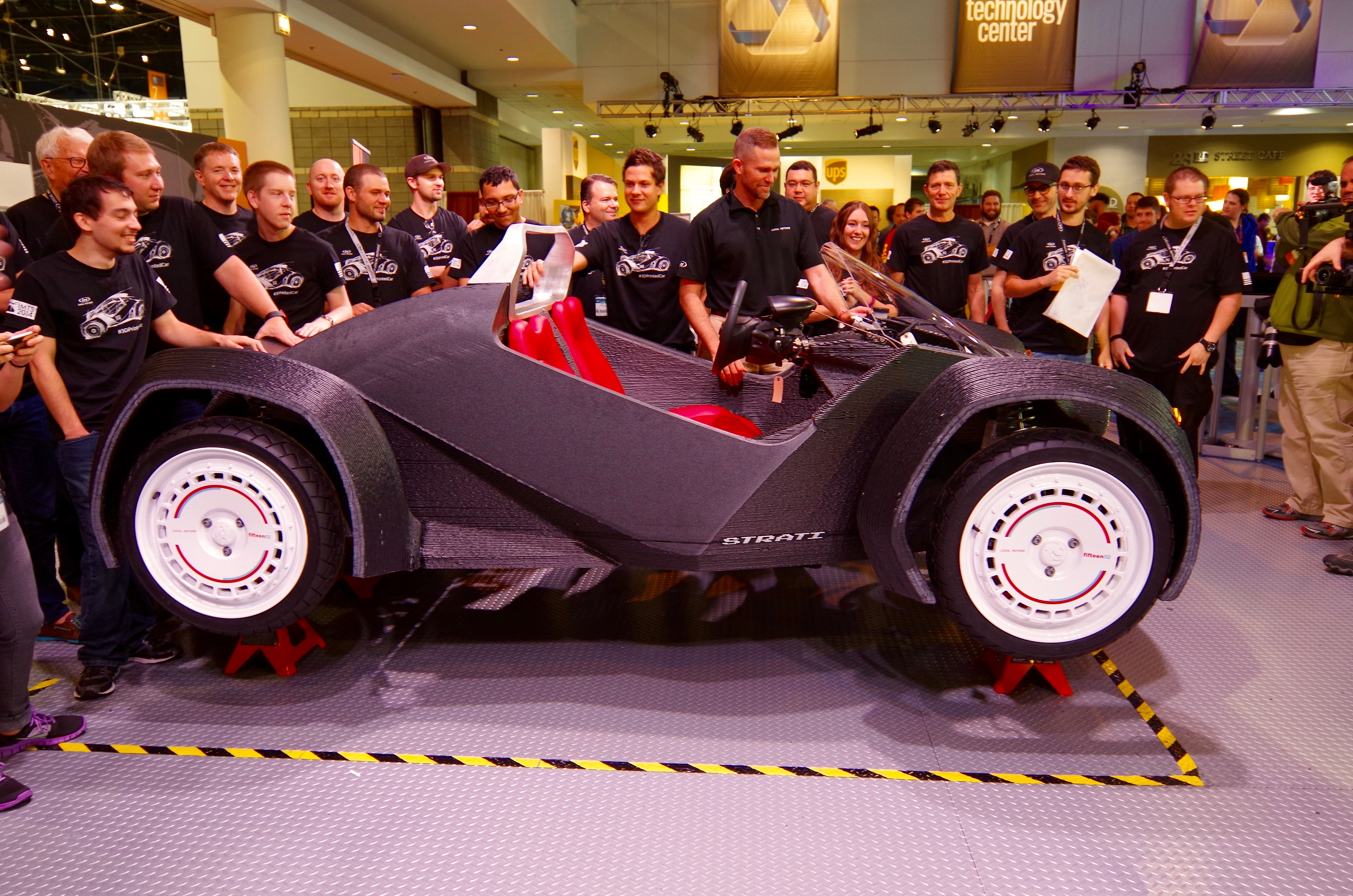
First 3D-printed Strati at IMTS 2014

Video: 3D-printing of Strati

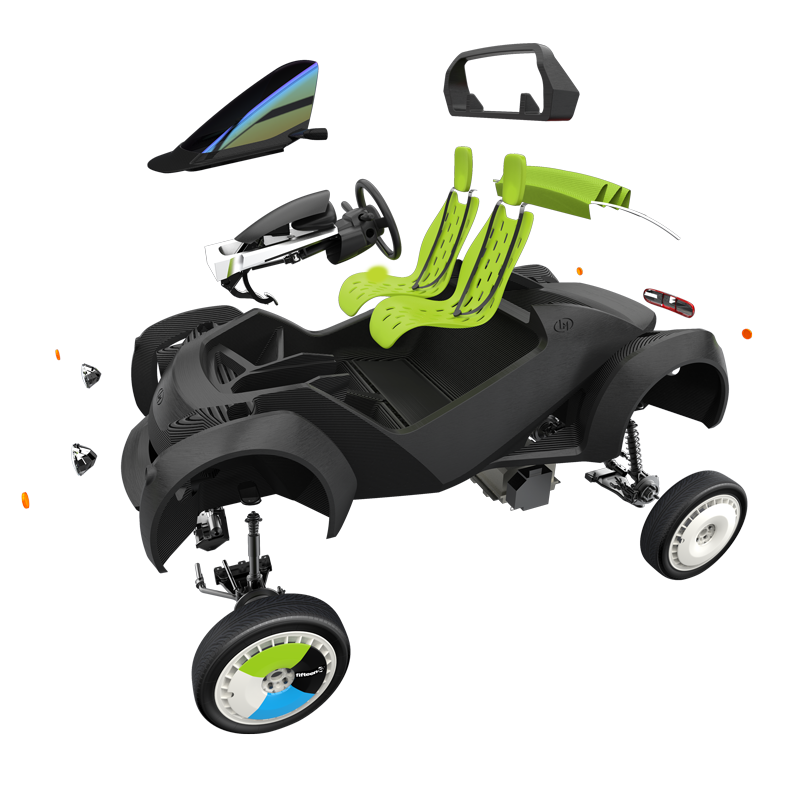
Strati (deconstructed)

In collaboration with Cincinnati Incorporated and Oak Ridge National Laboratory Local Motors manufactured Strati, the world's first 3D printed electric car. The printing took 44 hours to complete, and was witnessed by a live audience at the 2014 International Manufacturing Technology Show in McCormick Place, Chicago. The car consists of 50 individual parts, far less than a traditional vehicle (which is manufactured with roughly 30,000 parts). The Strati was designed by Michele Anoè, a member of the Local Motors community, and is produced in small quantities to serve strategic partnerships, such as with NXP Semiconductors. Strati gained widespread recognition and numerous accolades, including an SXSW Innovation Award, a Popular Mechanics Breakthrough Award, and a Guinness World Record.

== LM3D Swim ==
In 2015, the company debuted a 3D-printed car named the LM3D Swim. It was designed by Kevin Lo, a member of the Local Motors community. The materials used are 80 percent ABS plastic and 20 percent carbon fiber. The vehicle uses technology provided by IBM that offered IoT connectivity. The Swim is currently on display at the company's location in National Harbor, Maryland.

== Olli ==
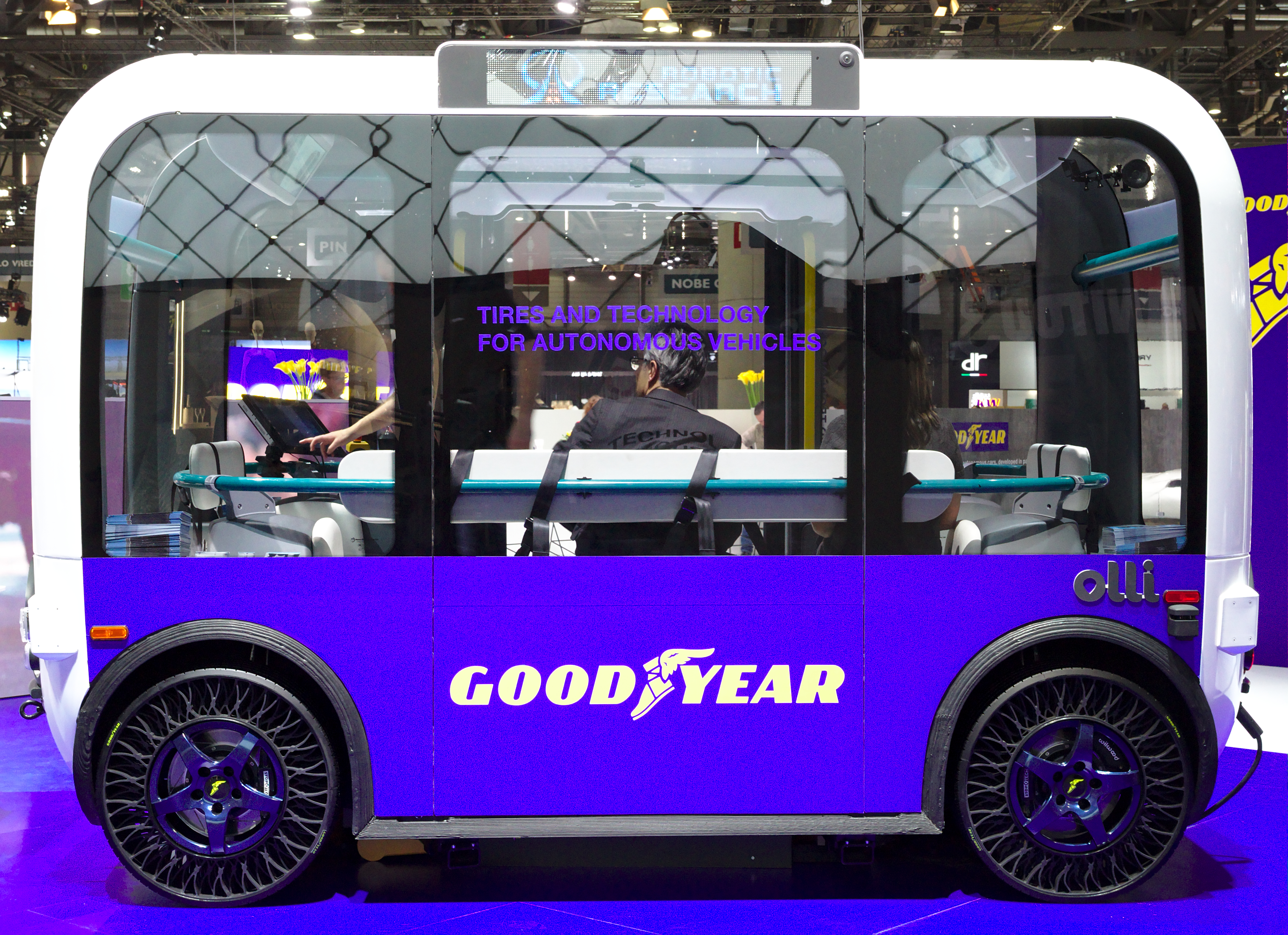
Olli

In 2016, the company unveiled an autonomous, electric-powered bus. The vehicle was designed by Edgar Sarmiento, initially named the "Berlino" from the Urban Mobility Challenge: Berlin 2030. The French tech entrepreneurs Damien Declerq and Gunnar Graef have been instrumental in organizing the challenge in Berlin. Local Motors built the vehicle and has IBM Watson technology installed to provide a personalized experience for riders. The vehicle was demonstrated live to their online audience on Facebook Live at a media event in National Harbor. On January 2, 2018, Local Motors received a pledge of up to a $1 billion in financing and operational support to customers of Olli from Florida-based Elite Transportation Services (ETS) with additional funding of $20 million from Texas-based Xcelerate.

Olli was manufactured in Knoxville, Tennessee, using additive manufacturing techniques, including 3D Printing. Traditional Steel-Tube chassis Olli vehicles were produced in Chandler, Arizona.

Miami-Dade County, the State of Nevada and the Danish Vesthimmerland Municipality expressed interest in using Olli on their roadways. As of January 2020, Olli has been deployed at the United Nations ITCILO campus in Turin, Italy to provide transport shuttles to employees and guests within the campus.

On December 17, 2021, an Olli bus operated by Durham Region Transit in Whitby, Ontario, being driven in manual mode, suddenly lost control and crashed into a tree. The attendant was critically injured and rushed to a trauma center in neighbouring Toronto.

Another pilot, the West Rouge Automated Shuttle program, was announced in spring 2021 by the Toronto Transit Commission from Rouge Hill GO Station, but the service was never started after the demise of Local Motors in 2022.

== See also ==
- Open design
- Microfactory
- Open innovation
- Creative Commons
