= Association for Manufacturing Technology =

Trade association based in Virginia, US

AMT - The Association For Manufacturing Technology
- Abbreviation: AMT
- Formation: 1902
- Type: NGO
- Purpose: American Manufacturing Technology Interests
- Headquarters: McLean, Virginia
- Location: United States
- Coordinates: 38.923706°N 77.218378°W
- Members: American Manufacturing Technology Providers
- Main organ: Board of Directors
- Website: AMT Online

The Association for Manufacturing Technology (AMT) is a trade association based in McLean, Virginia, in the United States. It was founded as the National Machine Tool Builders' Association (NMTBA) in 1902. It represents and promotes the interests of American providers of manufacturing machinery and equipment.

As machine tools advanced, NMTBA launched the first National Machine Tool Builders’ Exposition in 1927, which would later be rebranded IMTS- International Manufacturing Technology Show.

The AMT’s most visible activity is its management of the International Manufacturing Technology Show (IMTS), which is held on even-numbered years at McCormick Place in Chicago, Illinois.

Examples of activities fostered by the AMT include:

- Standardization of the taper used on Computer Numerically Controlled (CNC) milling machines. See Machine taper for a discussion of NMTB tapers.
- Initiation of MTConnect, a standard for open web-based communication to manufacturing equipment.
  Updated on ClearOS' web page: ClearOS Pedigree
- Publication of recommended standards for manufacturing related activities.
- Hosting and participation in standards committees, including NFPA 79, ANSI B11 Safety Standards.
- Annual Technology Forums in cooperation with the National Center for Manufacturing Sciences.
- Representing manufacturing interests in Washington.
- Providing manufacturing statistical data for publications.

AMT also supports their membership with technology centers and representative offices in China, India, Poland, Mexico and Brazil.

== Other AMT Events ==
AMT puts on a number of events throughout the year. While IMTS takes place in every even year, AMT also hosts the MFG Meeting and MTForecast Conference every year.

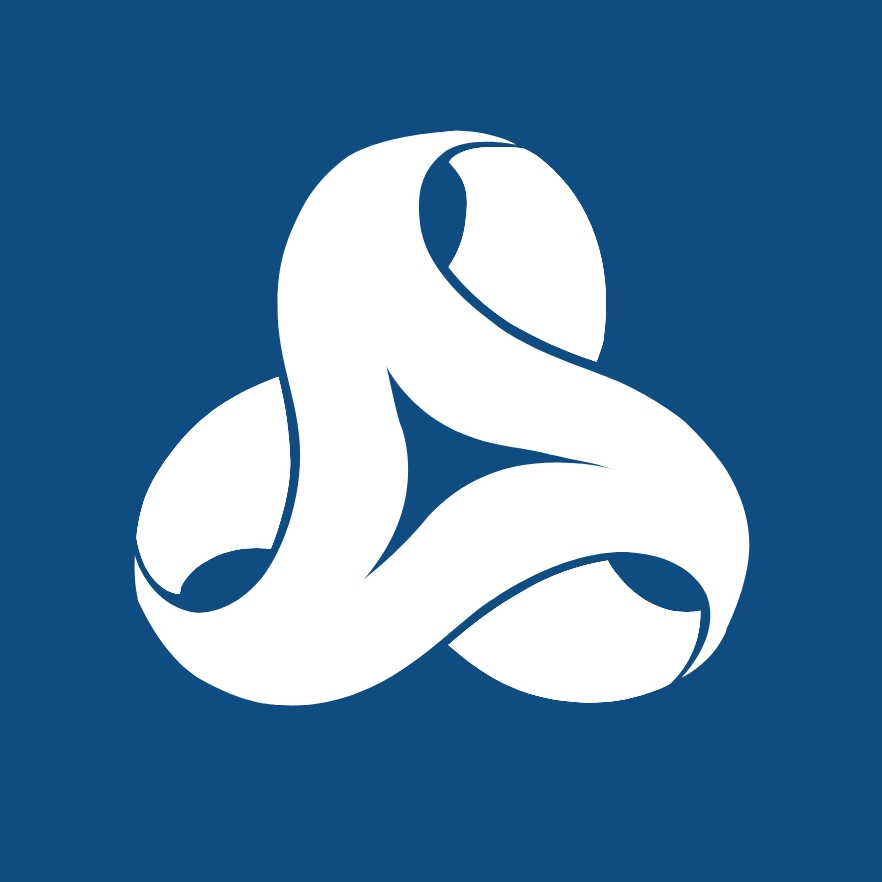
AMT Logo 2022

== See also ==
- EMO (trade show)
- International Manufacturing Technology Show
