= Strati (automobile) =

American electric car

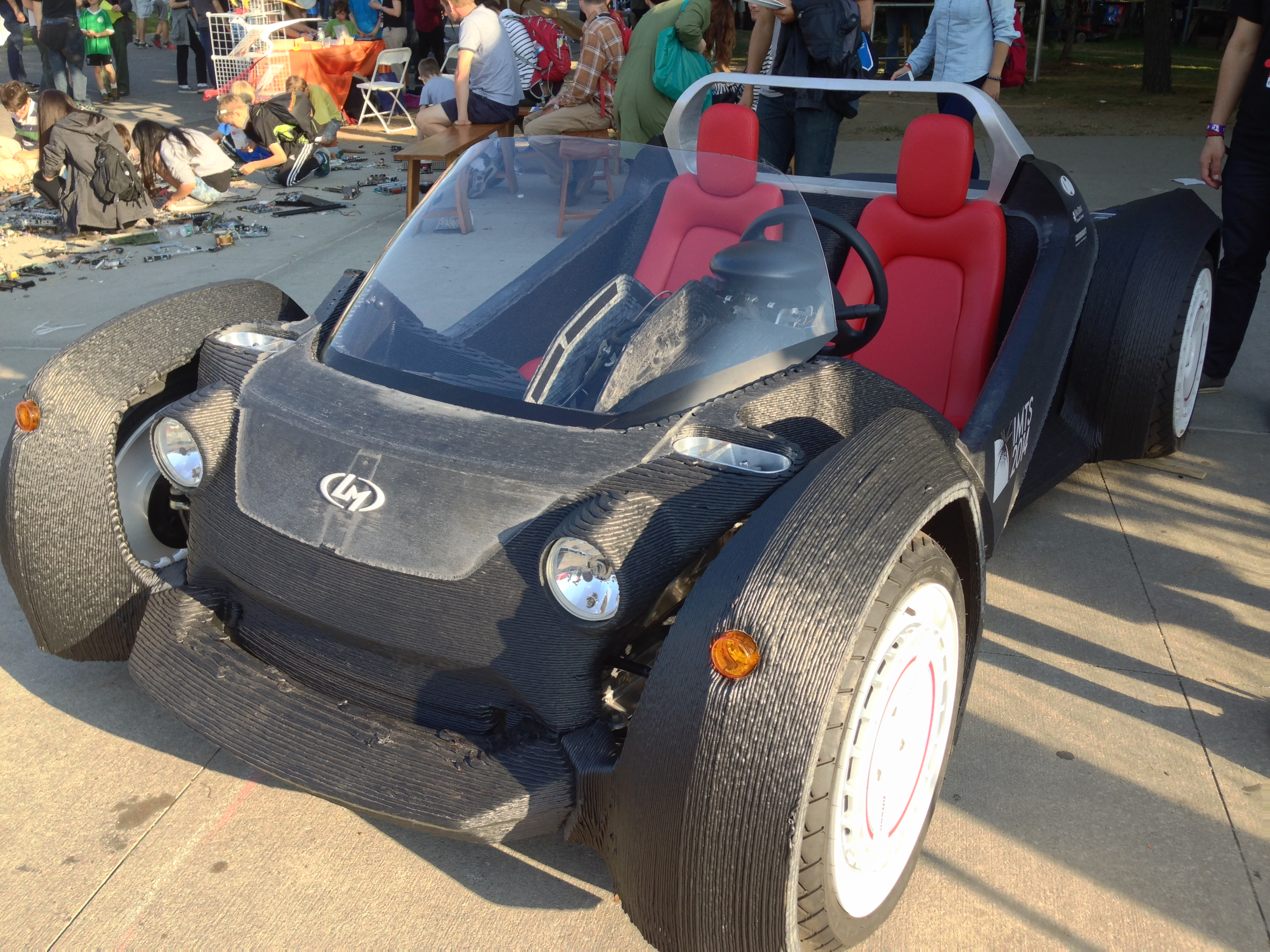
Overall view of Strati

Strati is the world's first 3D printed car. It is an electric car developed and produced by Local Motors and manufactured in collaboration with Oak Ridge National Laboratory and Cincinnati Incorporated. It is the world's first electric car to heavily utilize 3D printing during the production process. The car was manufactured using a Large Scale 3D Printer developed by ORNL and Cincinnati Inc. The car took just 44 hours to print during the 2014 International Manufacturing Technology Show in Chicago, Illinois. The printing was followed by three days of milling and assembling, with the completed car first test-driven on September 13, 2014. Strati is claimed to be the world's first 3D-Printed electric car.

== Design ==
In April 2014, Local Motors organized the 3D Printed Car Design Challenge crowdsourcing to assist in the production of a full-body 3D-printed car. Seven finalists were selected from more than 200 submissions. In June 2014, Local Motors announced that the challenge was won by Michele Anoé of Italy, who was awarded the $5,000 prize. After the contest, Local Motors took the design and made several modifications so that the car could be manufactured through 3D-Printing.

== Specifications ==
The two-seat Strati is considered to be a "neighborhood" electric car. Depending on the configuration of the battery packs, the range of the car can be 100 to 120 mi (160 to 190 km) with top speeds of 40 mph (64 km/h). The car is not designed to be used on highways, as it does not meet the required safety test requirements. Production is planned by the end of 2015, with prices between $18,000 and $30,000.

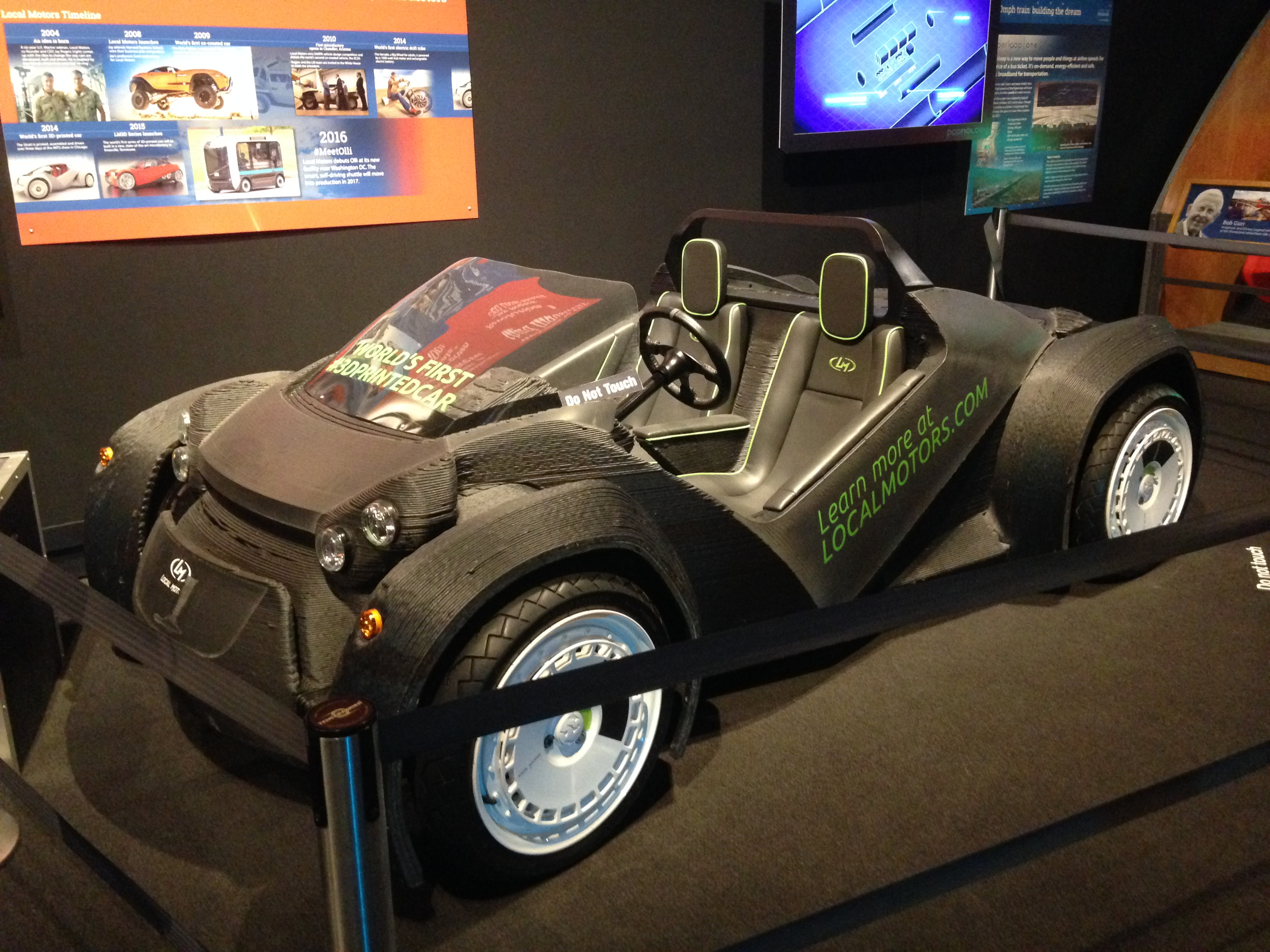
Front 3/4 view

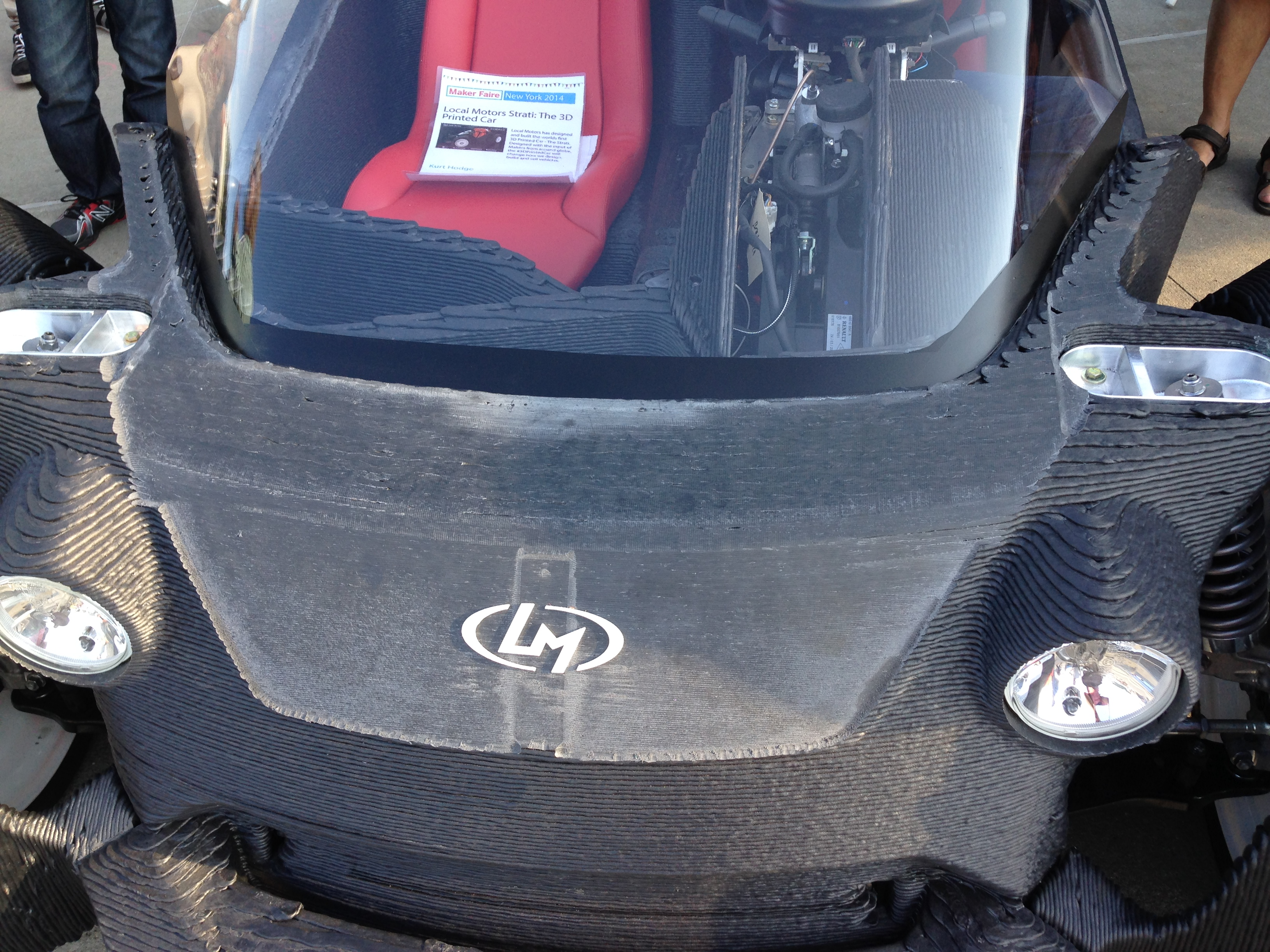
Front view with steering details exposed

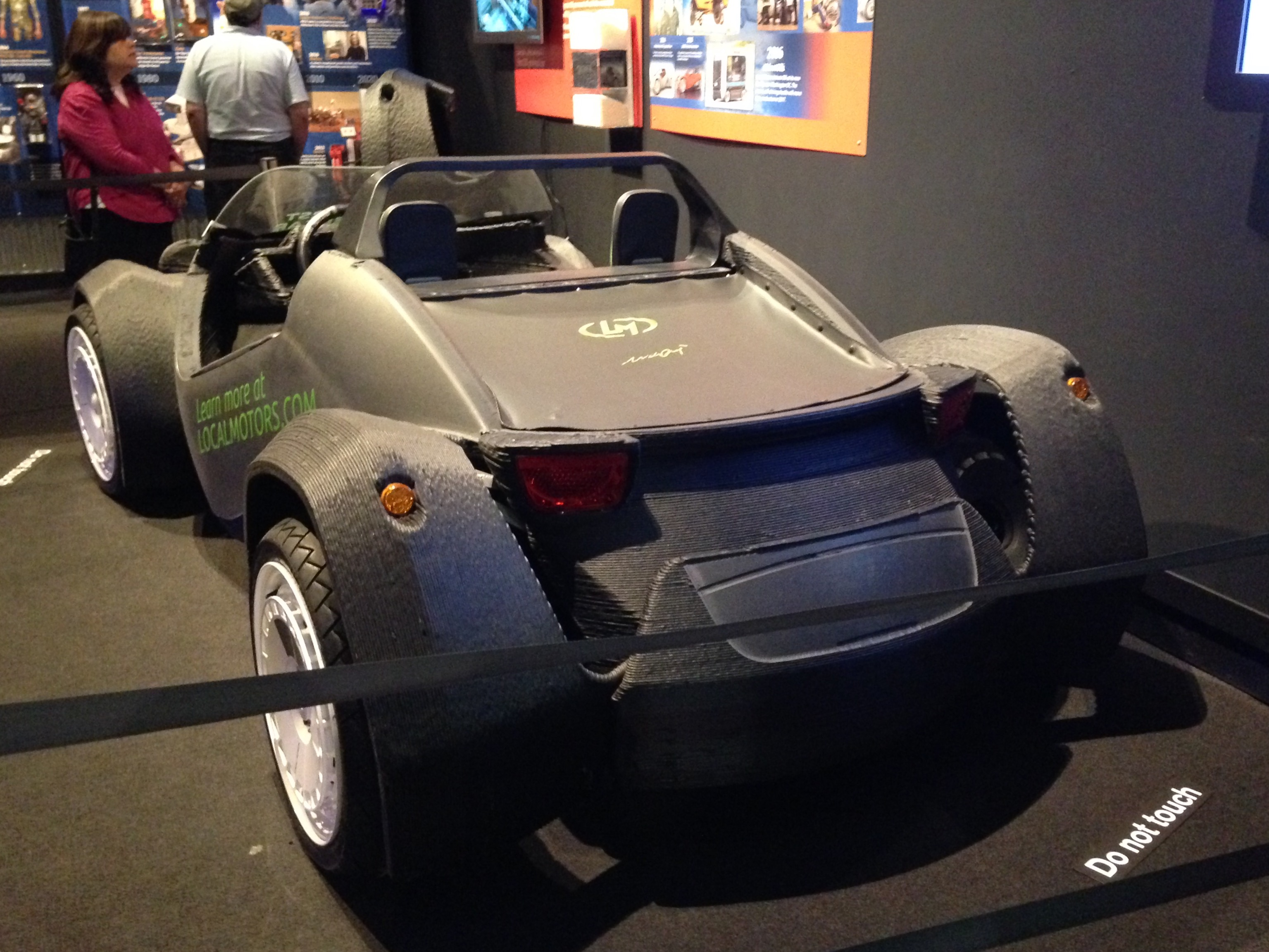
Rear 3/4 view

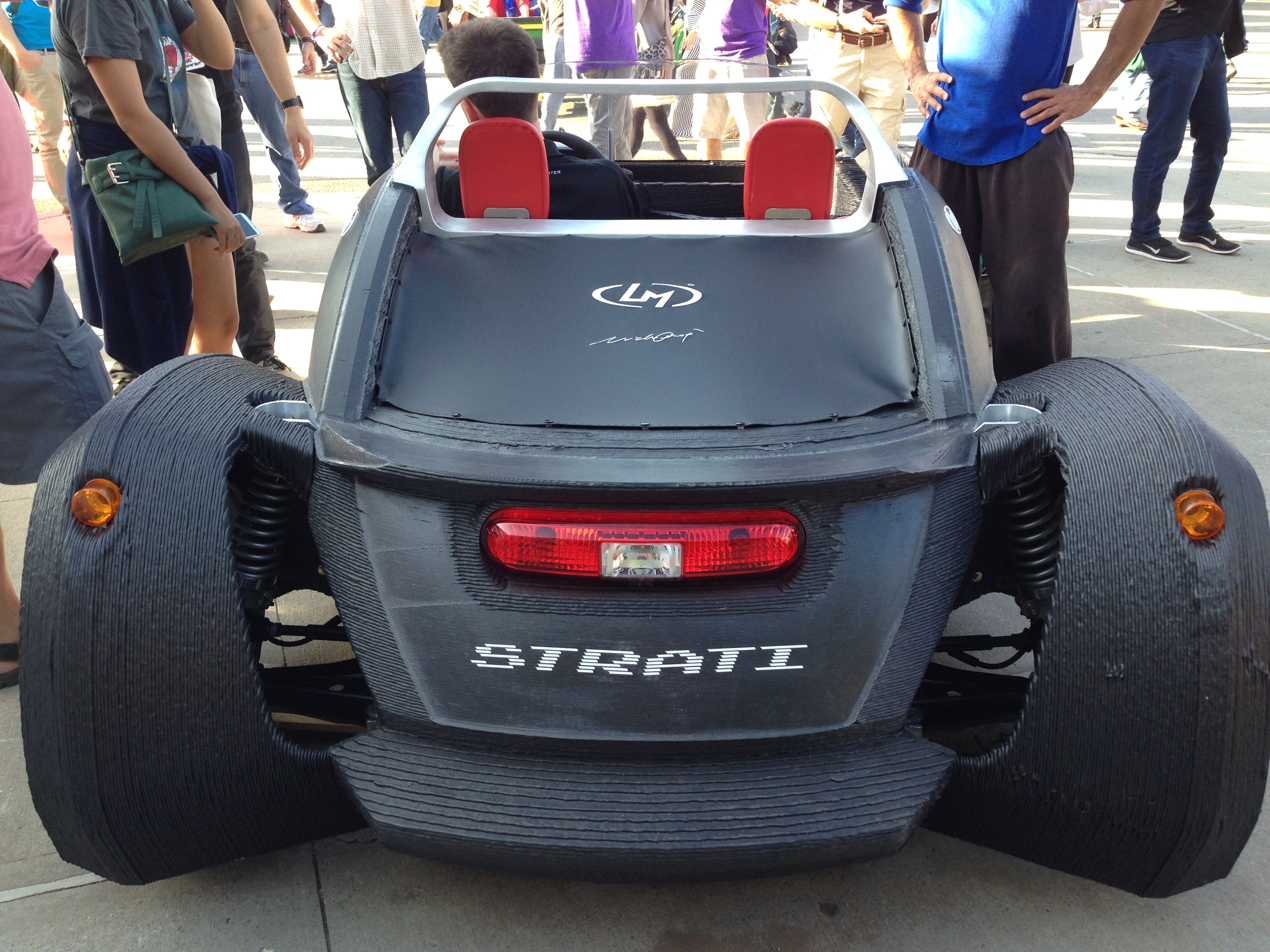
Rear view

== Manufacturing ==
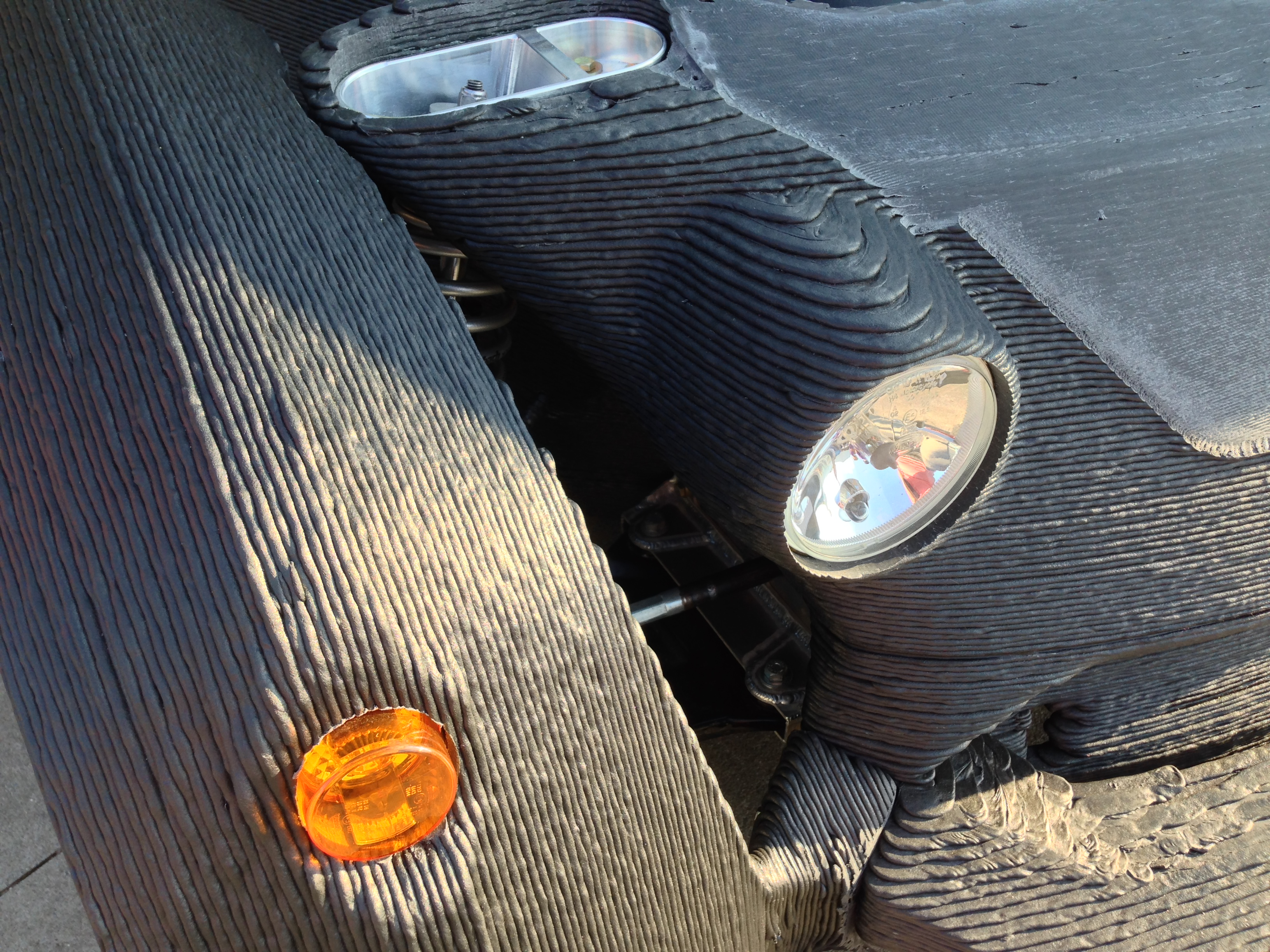
Details of the printed body of a Strati

Following the design competition, Local Motors handed off the design to the engineers at ORNL who perfected the process of Large Scale 3D Printing such that the Local Motors design could actually be manufactured. ORNL worked with Cincinnati Incorporated to develop the printer that would allow for the printing of the entire car. With the printer, ORNL and Cincinnati Inc. manufactured all body parts of the car and allowed for easy mounting of the mechanical parts, such as the electric motors and batteries.

Strati is printed from thermoplastic using a big area additive manufacturing (BAAM) machine (a large FDM 3D-printer). This material is fully recyclable, which can be chopped and reprocessed to be used in printing another car. After the car is printed, the mechanical and electrical parts such as battery, motors, and suspension are manually assembled.

The printing process has been improved by ORNL since July 2014, bringing the printing time of 140 hours down to less than 45 hours in September. Since IMTS, ORNL has brought the printing time of the Strati to less than 24 hours and is continuing their research efforts with the hope of printing the car in less than 10 hours.

== The world's first title ==
Disputes exist over the title of the world's first 3D-printed car. In 2010, a hybrid car "Urbee" was 3D-printed using an additive manufacturing process for the entire body. Local Motors claimed that Urbee's manufacturer only 3D-printed the panels and other exterior parts, but used standard parts for the internal structure. For Strati, the company claimed that 3D printing was used for all except the parts that are "mechanically involved". Strati claims to be the world's first 3D-printed electric car.
