= International Manufacturing Technology Show =

Trade show in the US

- Frequency: Every 2 Years (Even)
- Venue: McCormick Place
- Established: 1927
- Organized by: AMT-Association for Manufacturing Technology
- Website: IMTS.com

The International Manufacturing Technology Show (IMTS), first held in Cleveland, Ohio in 1927 , is a trade show that features industrial machinery and technology. It is the largest manufacturing technology trade show in North America, and in 1990 was renamed from the original "International Machine Tool Show" to reflect the growing scope of the show to additional technologies such as welding, lubrication, and materials engineering. The show is managed by the Association for Manufacturing Technology.

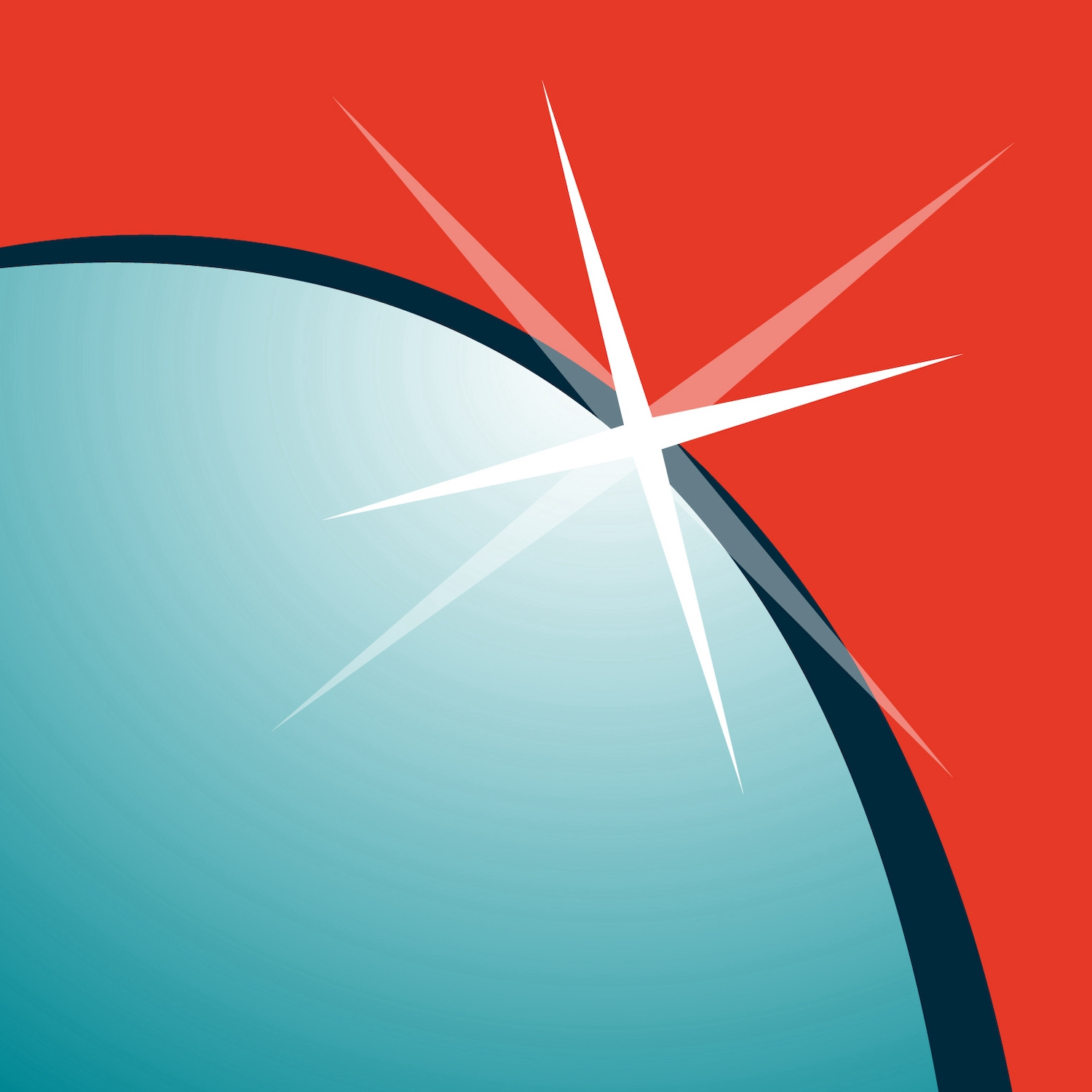
IMTS 2022 Logo

An agreement between the AMT and the CECIMO (European Machine Tool Industry Association), which organizes the European-based EMO trade show for the metal working industry, coordinates the IMTS and the EMO such that every even-numbered year the IMTS is held in Chicago, and every odd-numbered year the EMO is held in Europe.

The next show is scheduled for September 14-19, 2026 at McCormick Place, Chicago https://www.imts.com/show/abouttheshow.cfm

== Scale & Exhibitors ==
The six-day show is held in even-numbered years at Chicago's McCormick Place and draws attendees and exhibitors from the U.S. and some 119 other countries. IMTS was cancelled in 2020 due to the COVID-19 pandemic, but reconvened for 2022. For 2018, there were 129,415 registrants and 2,563 exhibitors across four buildings and 1,424,232 square feet (132,315.5 m^{2}) of exhibit space.

Since 2004, IMTS has sponsored the Emerging Technology Center, where the latest academic and industrial advancements are showcased. IMTS 2012, for example, featured a Local Motors Rally Fighter car built live on the show floor, MTConnect, the open-source communication and interconnectivity standard, and MTInsight, the game-changing customized manufacturing business intelligence system.

== See also ==
- List of computer-aided manufacturing software
