= EMO (trade show) =

Metal-working industry trade show

EMO is a European trade show for the manufacturing industries. It occurs every odd-numbered year, with a cycle that finds it at the Hanover Fairground in Hanover, Germany for 2 shows, then the Fiera Milano exhibition center in Milan, Italy for 1 show.

The name EMO came from the name Exposition Mondiale de la Machine-Outil (Machine Tool World Exposition), and the scope of the content still reflects the machine tool heritage, although it now also extends beyond it. The show covers the spectrum of metalworking technologies, such as machine tools for milling, turning, and forming; manufacturing systems; precision measuring tools; automated materials handling; computer technology; industrial electronics; and accessories.

EMO is run by CECIMO, the European Association of the Machine Tool Industries (Comité européen de coopération des industries de la machine-outil) (www.cecimo.eu). The Verein Deutscher Werkzeugmaschinenfabriken (German Machine Tool Builders’ Association), or VDW, is responsible for the organization of the trade show when in Hanover, while UCIMU, the Association of Italian Manufacturers of Machine Tools, Robots, Automation Systems and ancillary products (NC, tools, components, accessories) manages the Milan show.

An agreement between the Association for Manufacturing Technology (AMT), which organizes the US-based International Manufacturing Technology Show (IMTS) and CECIMO coordinates the IMTS and the EMO such that every even-numbered year the IMTS is held in Chicago, and every odd-numbered year the EMO is held in Europe.

== History ==
EMO began as the EEMO (Exposition européenne de machines-outils, European machine tools exhibition). The first EEMO was held in 1951. The name changed in 1975 to EMO (Exposition Mondiale de la Machine-Outil). Nowadays its scope extends beyond machine tools, and the acronym expansion is not used by CECIMO anymore.
