= National Center for Manufacturing Sciences =

US nonprofit consortium

- Type: Non-Profit
- Industry: Research & Development, Technology
- Founded: 1986
- Headquarters: Ann Arbor, Michigan
- Key people: Lisa Strama, CEO
- Revenue: 18,417,130 United States dollar (2011)
- Total assets: 10,174,259 United States dollar (2011)
- Website: www.ncms.org

The National Center for Manufacturing Sciences (NCMS) is a 501(c)(3) non-profit cross-industry research and development consortium located in Ann Arbor, Michigan. Membership consists of a network of industry, government, non-profit organizations, and academia partners to develop, demonstrate, and transition innovative technologies efficiently, with resources minimization.

NCMS brings together project teams made up of technology providers, suppliers, and users to perform research and development (R&D). These project teams often include cross-industry participants.

== Mission ==
The NCMS mission is to lead the rapid development of cross-industry R&D programs to build the global competitiveness of its manufacturing industry partners.

== History ==
NCMS was formed in 1986, following the implementation of the National Cooperative Research Act of 1984, later renamed the National Cooperative Research and Production Act of 1993.

NCMS was created to help revitalize the machine tool industry but has grown to include all sectors of North American manufacturing. In 1998, NCMS organized the Commercial Technologies for Maintenance Activities (CTMA), a large consortium of NCMS, the U.S. Department of Defense (DoD), and other NCMS member companies.

In 2020, NCMS was awarded its fourth consecutive Commercial Technologies for Maintenance Activities (CTMA) Cooperative Agreement, extending its 22 years of success as the managing partner for the CTMA program.

== Locations ==
NCMS is based in Ann Arbor, Michigan and with offices in the following cities:

- Washington, DC
- Bremerton, Washington
- Farmington Hills, Michigan
