= Rally Fighter =

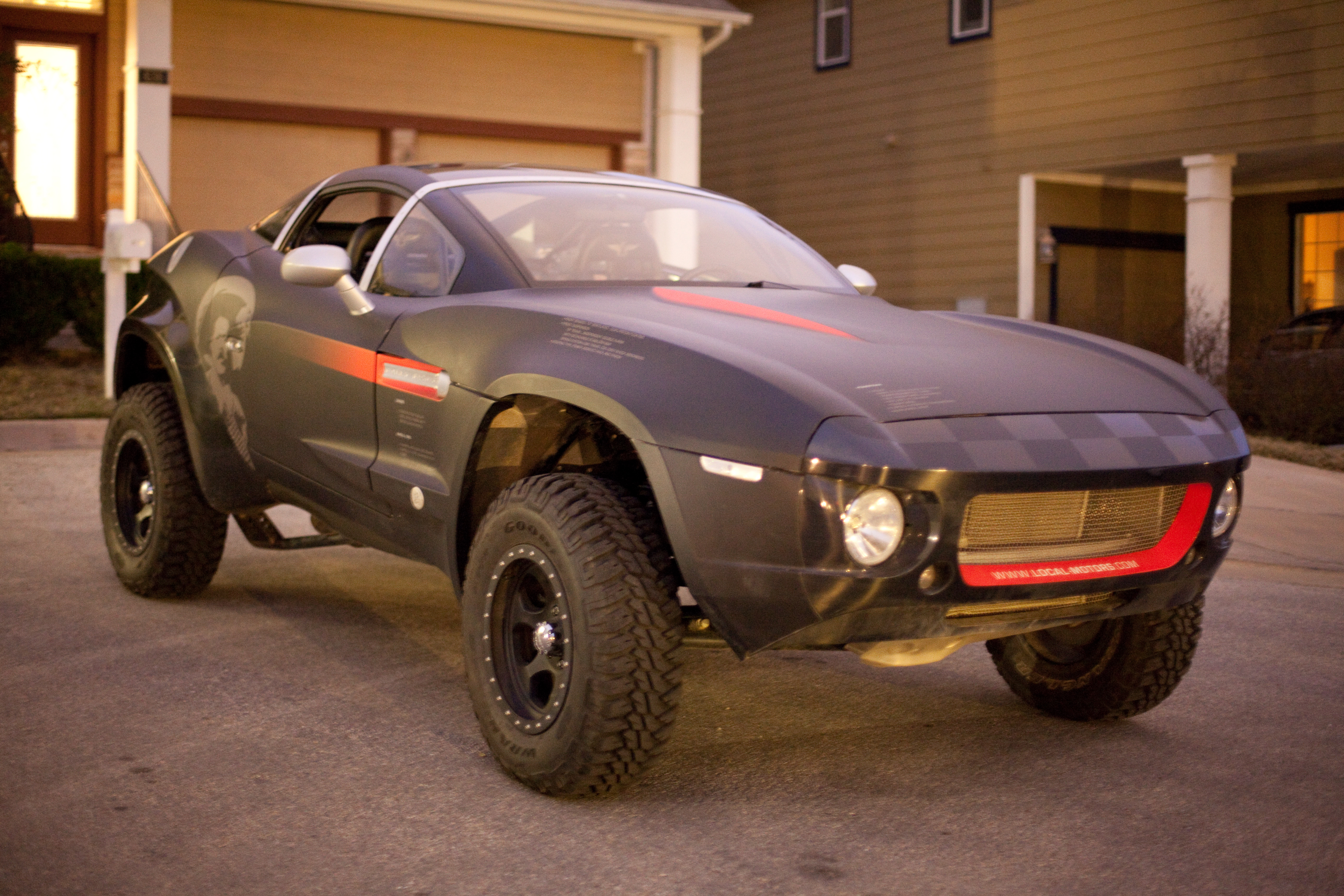

Overview
- Manufacturer: Local Motors
- Production: 2010–2016 (50 produced)
- Assembly: Chandler, Arizona (Local Motors)
- Designer: Sangho Kim

Body and chassis
- Class: Off-road buggy
- Body style: 2-door coupe
- Layout: Front mid-engine, rear-wheel drive

Powertrain
- Engine: 6.2 L GM LS3 V8
- Power output: 430 hp (321 kW; 436 PS)
- Transmission: 4-speed 4L85-E automatic

Dimensions
- Wheelbase: 2,921 mm (115.0 in)
- Length: 4,800 mm (189.0 in)
- Width: 2,057 mm (81.0 in)
- Height: 1,759 mm (69.3 in) high ride, 1,556 mm (61.3 in) low ride
- Curb weight: 1,720 kg (3,792 lb)

The Rally Fighter is an American automobile manufactured by Local Motors and introduced in 2009. It is the first car to be developed using co-creation design. The exterior design was submitted by Sangho Kim and selected through community votes. The Rally Fighter is street legal in all 50 US states.

== Specifications ==
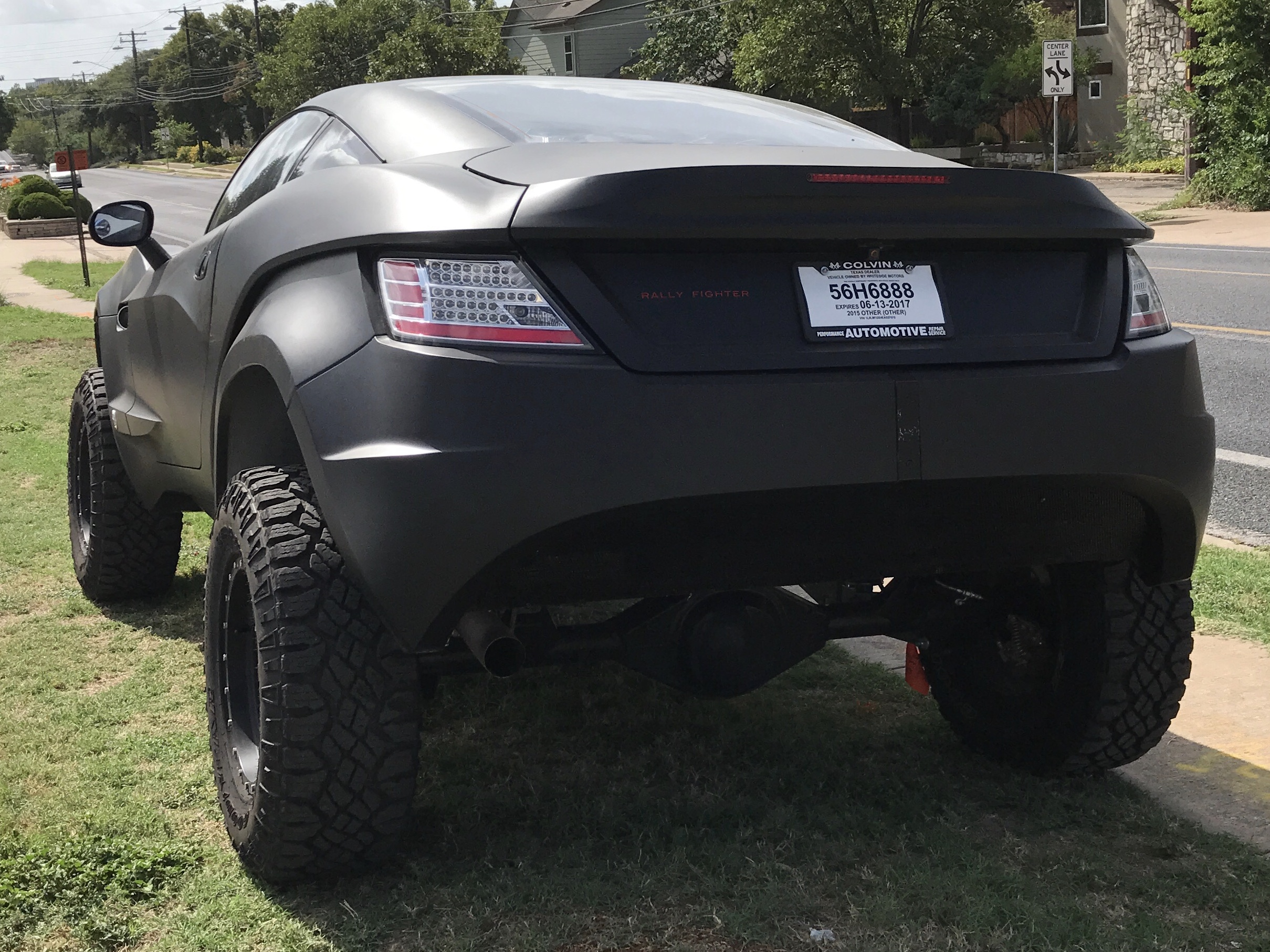
Rear view

The Rally Fighter is powered by a front-mid mounted 6.2 L GM LS3 V8 that produces 430 hp (321 kW; 436 PS) at 5,900 rpm and 424 lb⋅ft (575 N⋅m) of torque at 4,600 rpm. Power goes to the rear wheels through a 4-speed GM 4L85-E automatic transmission. The suspension utilizes “Double A-Arms” in the front end and a Solid Ford 230 mm (9 in) axle using either a “Watts-Link” to locate the axle laterally and a “3-Link” with Trailing arms to locate the axle vertically in the rear or utilized a “Triangulated 4-Link” rear control arm setup to locate the axle in every direction. both using coil springs and “Coil-over” Long travel telescopic shock absorbers. This gives it 410 mm (16 in) of suspension travel in the front and 510 mm (20 in) in the rear. It also features a fiberglass body to save weight. In the interior, the Rally Fighter is equipped with standard 4-point harness seat belts, a full roll cage and Recaro seats, as well as amenities such as air conditioning, stereo and power windows.

== Build process ==
The Rally Fighter used an assembly process where the buyer of the car went to one of Local Motors' micro-factories to assemble their car with help from a team of Local Motors employees. This also allowed the Rally Fighter to be titled as a kit car or component car in the United States. The Rally Fighter is street legal in all 50 states and upwards of 50 cars have been produced.

== Crowd sourcing ==
The Rally Fighter is an open-source vehicle. The Rally Fighter is believed to be the first production vehicle designed through crowdsourcing, the process of drawing input from a global community of interested people via the Internet. The winning design was submitted by Sangho Kim of Pasadena, California, and is inspired by a P-51 Mustang fighter plane. It was chosen through a vote in 2009 by a community of people on the Internet. Using this method, the car was developed from start to finish in 18 months.

== In media ==
The Rally Fighter appears in the 2014 film Transformers: Age of Extinction and 2017 film The Fate of the Furious.

The Rally Fighter appears as a playable vehicle in Forza Horizon and CSR Racing 2.
