= 2.5D (disambiguation) =

2.5D is a computer graphics term for creating the impression of a three-dimensional scene without using full 3D rendering.

2.5D may also refer to:

- 2.5D (machining), a technique used in machining to project a plane into a third dimension
- 2.5D (visual perception), an effect in visual perception where the 3D environment of the observer is projected onto the 2D planes of the retinas
- A non-integer dimension in mathematics; see Hausdorff dimension
- A categorization of 3D platform games where the flow of the gameplay is linear and constrained mostly to a plane
- 2.5D integrated circuit: multiple integrated circuit (IC) dies interconnected on an interposer in a single package
- 2.5D musical: a genre of Japanese theatre featuring anime, manga, and video games with use of projection mapping
- 2.5D in shallow geophysics refers to closely-spaced, parallel 2D profiles of data or subsurface models

== See also ==
- 2.5 (disambiguation)
