= 5/2 =

5/2 may refer to:

- May 2 (month-day date notation)
- February 5 (day-month date notation)
- A form of quintuple meter
- The pentagram
- 2.5 (disambiguation), 2½, or two and half
