= 2.5 =

2.5, 2½ or two and a half may refer to:

Technology

- Version 2.5 or v2.5, a designation used in software versioning
- 2.5D, or 3/4 perspective and pseudo-3D, an attempt to render 3-dimensional images in 2-dimensions
- 2.5D (machining), technique used in machining to project a plane into 3rd dimension
- 2.5D (visual perception), effect in visual perception where the 3D environment of the observer is projected onto the 2D planes of the retinas
- 2.5G phone network; see 2G
- 2.5-millimeter band

Culture

- Two and a Half Men, American television sitcom
- Hood Hop 2.5, 2009 album by J-Kwon
- Jackass 2.5, a 2007 direct-to-video feature; see Jackass Number Two
- Proposition 2½, Massachusetts statute which limits property tax increases by municipalities

== See also ==
- 2.5D (disambiguation)
