= Fred Howe =

Fred or Frederic(k) Howe may refer to:

- Fred Howe (footballer, born 1912) (1912–1984), English football striker for Liverpool and others
- Fred Howe (footballer, born 1895), English football wing half for Coventry City and Brentford
- Frederic C. Howe (1867–1940), American writer and government administrator
  - SS Frederic C. Howe, a Liberty ship
- Frederick W. Howe (1822–1891), American machine tool innovator and inventor
