= Micrometer adjustment nut =

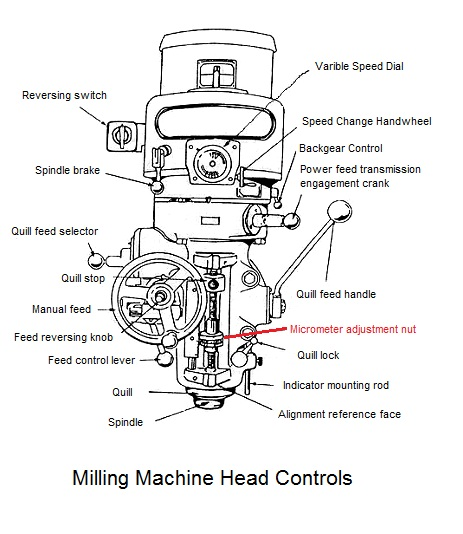
The micrometer adjustment nut is used by a milling machine operator to limit the depth to which a cutting tool may plunge into a workpiece

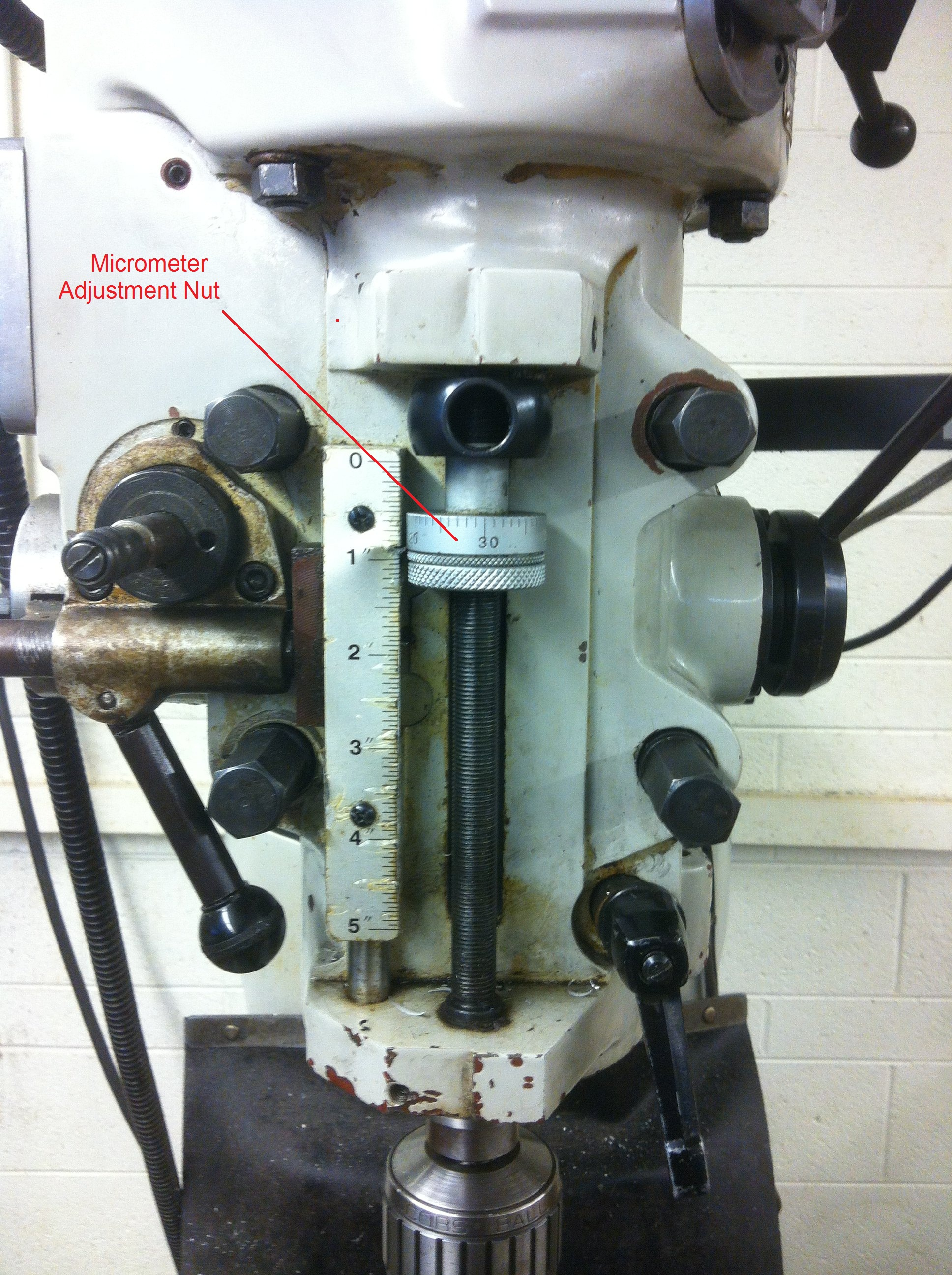
Photograph of a micrometer adjustment nut on a milling machine

On a manual milling machine, the micrometer adjustment nut limits the depth to which the cutting tool may plunge into the workpiece.

The nut is located on a threaded rod on the mill head. The machine operator moves it up or down by rotating it clockwise (to move it down) or counter-clockwise (to move it up). Moving the nut down increases the depth to which the cutting tool may plunge into the workpiece. Moving the nut up reduces the depth to which the cutting tool may plunge into the workpiece.
