= Multiaxis machining =

Manufacturing processes using tools that can move in 4 or more directions

Multiaxis machining is a manufacturing process that involves tools that move in 4 or more directions and are used to manufacture parts out of metal or other materials by removing excess material through milling, water jet cutting, or laser cutting. This type of machining was originally performed mechanically on large complex machines. These machines operated on 4, 5, 6, and even 12 axes which were controlled individually via levers that rested on cam plates. The cam plates offered the ability to control the tooling device, the table in which the part is secured, as well as rotating the tooling or part within the machine. Due to the machines size and complexity it took extensive amounts of time to set them up for production. Once computer numerically controlled (CNC) machining was introduced it provided a faster, more efficient method for machining complex parts.

Typical CNC tools support translation in three axes; multiaxis machines also support rotation around one or multiple axes. Five-axis machines are commonly used in industry in which the workpiece is translated linearly along three axes (typically x, y, and z) and the tooling spindle is capable of rotation about an additional two axes.

There are now many computer aided manufacturing (CAM) software systems available to support multiaxis machining including software that can automatically convert three-axis toolpaths into five-axis toolpaths. Prior to the advancement of CAM, transferring information from design to production often required extensive manual labor, generating errors and resulting in wasted time and material.

There are three main components to multiaxis machines:

1. The machines physical capabilities i.e. torque, spindle speed, axis orientation/operation.
2. The CNC drive system, the components that move the machine. This includes servo-motors, rapid traverse systems, ball screws, and how positioning is monitored.
3. The CNC controller, this is how data is transferred/stored within machine, and input data is processed and executed.

Multiaxis machines offer several improvements over other CNC tools, at the cost of increased complexity and price of the machine:

- The amount of human labor is reduced, if the piece would otherwise have to be turned manually during the machining.
- A better surface finish can be obtained by moving the tool tangentially about the surface (as opposed to moving the workpiece around the spindle).
- More complex parts can be manufactured, particularly parts with curved holes.
- Increased tool life due to the ability to achieve optimal angles between the tool and machining surface.
- Higher quality parts. What once required multiple setups now can be executed in only a few if not one, reducing steps and decreasing the opportunity for error.

The number of axes for multiaxis machines varies from 4 to 9. Each axis of movement is implemented either by moving the table (into which the workpiece is attached), or by moving the tool. The actual configuration of axes varies, therefore machines with the same number of axes can differ in the movements that can be performed.

== Applications ==
Multiaxis CNC machines are used in many industries including:

- Aerospace industry: Multiaxis machines are used in the manufacturing of aircraft parts, which allow for complex parts to be made efficiently.
- Automotive industry: Multiaxis CNC machines create engine housings, rims and headlights.
- Furniture industry: CNC lathes mass-produce wooden table legs as well as most other components.
- Medical industry: Multiaxis CNC machines create custom hip replacements, dental implants, and prosthetic limbs.

Multiaxis machining is also commonly used for rapid prototyping as it can create strong, high quality models out of metal, plastic, and wood while still being easily programmable.

Comparison of different multiaxis machines
Name	# of rotary axes on head	# of rotary axes on table	Advantages over other multiaxis machines	Diagram
CNC lathe	0	1 rotating X axis	Optimized for machining cylindrical objects	
Pivot spindle head and rotary table	1 rotating X axis	1 rotating Y axis	Able to have a larger work area that increases the versatility of the machine and the kinds of parts it can mill; More stable than a Double Pivot Spindle Head	
Double rotary table	0	1 rotating X axis 1 rotating Y axis	Best method for milling overhangs; Easiest way to convert a 3 axis machine to a 5 axis machine; Able to machine higher-volume objects	
Double pivot spindle head	1 rotating Y axis 1 rotating Z axis	0	Stationary base allows for heavy parts to be milled; Ideal for milling non-round objects	
Rotary table and table trunion	0	1 rotating Z axis 1 rotating axis 45° between X & Y axes	Similar to a Double Rotary Table, but the 45° axis allows it to be more compact; Most cost-effective for machining small parts	

== Computer-aided manufacturing (CAM) software ==
CAM software automates the process of converting 3D models into tool paths, the route the multiaxis machine takes to mill a part (Fig. 1). This software takes into account the different parameters of the tool head (in the case of a CNC router, this would be the bit size), dimensions of the blank, and any constraints the machine may have. The tool paths for multiple passes can be generated to produce a higher level of detail on the parts. The first few passes remove large amounts of material, while the final, most important pass creates the surface finish. In the case of the CNC lathe, the CAM software will optimize the tool path to have the central axis of the part align with the rotary of the lathe. Once the tool paths have been generated, the CAM software will convert them into G-code, allowing the CNC machine to begin milling.

CAM software is currently the limiting factor in the capabilities of a multiaxis machine with ongoing development. Recent breakthroughs in this space include:

- Topology optimization, an algorithm that refines 3D models to be more efficient and cost-effective on CNC machines.
- Automated recognition of 3D model features, which can simplify tool path generation by identifying instructions for the machine to follow from the features of the 3D model.

== See also ==
- Numerical control
