= Arbor milling =

Type of milling process

Arbor milling is a cutting process which removes material via a multi-toothed cutter. An arbor mill is a type of milling machine characterized by its ability to rapidly remove material from a variety of materials. This milling process is not only rapid but also versatile.

== Process characteristics ==
- Cuts surfaces parallel to the rotational axis of the tool unlike drilling (perpendicular to axis)
- Multipoint cutter creates discontinuous chips
- Capable of producing flat, shaped, or contoured surfaces on a workpiece
- Cutters supported on an arbor (mandrel)
- High metal removal rate
- Sweeps chipped material away as it works

== Process schematic ==
This process progressively makes a surface to the user's specifications as the material is moved against the milling tool or the workpiece stays stationary while the arbor milling cutter moves across it to provide the desired shape. There are two types of milling that involve the directional movement of the workpiece, conventional and climb. If the workpiece is moving the opposite direction of the tool rotation this is called conventional milling. If the workpiece is moving the same direction as the tool rotation, this is called climb milling.

== Setup and equipment ==
Arbor milling is commonly performed on a horizontal milling machine. The tool is mounted on an arbor/mandrel (like an axle) that is suspended between the spindle and arbor support. This type of machine allows the tool to be placed in numerous positions in relation to the workpiece.

== Workpiece materials ==
The workpiece involved in arbor milling can be a flat material or a shaped material: either one can be worked with desirable results. The hardness of the materials milled should be no harder than Rockwell C25 (Rockwell scale), but workpieces harder than this can be successfully milled. Materials with good or excellent machinability include aluminum, brass, mild steel, cast iron, and thermoset plastics. Though initially ductile, stainless steel tends to work harden and thus has only a fair compatibility with this milling process (though it is in the feasible range).

== Tooling materials ==
Although high speed tool steel has been used in the past it is quickly being replaced by carbide, ceramic, or diamond tooling. Because carbide inserts are long lasting and easily replaced, they lend themselves to high production. Ceramic tools are brittle but can withstand high temperatures. This makes high speed machining possible. Diamond tools are used to achieve a superior surface finish (though they can only be used on non-ferrous materials).

== Tolerances and surface finish ==
In most applications, tolerances can be held within ±0.005 in. For precision application, tolerances can be held within ±0.001 in. It is possible to have a surface finish range of 32 to 500 microinches, but typically the range is 63 to 200 microinches. Finish cuts will generate surfaces near 32 to 63 microinches, roughing cuts near 200 microinches.

== Tool styles and possibilities ==
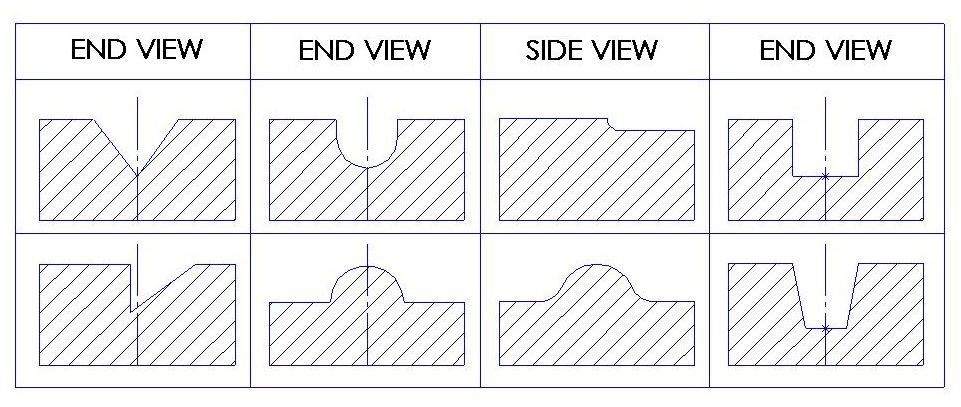
Arbor Milling Possibilities

The most common tool styles used in arbor milling are double angle, form relived, plane, and staggered tooth, among many other tool styles. The double angle milling cutter can make a wide variety of V-shaped cuts with straight surfaces in the material. A form relieved milling cutter can produce U-shaped cuts with curved surfaces, unlike the double angle cutter, into the material. A plane milling cutter can produce surfaces similar to a planer but can make varying contours across the material. A staggered tooth milling cutter can produce a rectangular groove in the material at varying depths and widths. The cutters can be stacked to mill combined profiles. The typical width of cuts made by arbor milling range from 0.25 in to 6 in, and the typical depths range from 0.02 in to 0.05 in.

== Effects on work material properties ==
Mechanical properties of the workpiece may be affected with a built-up edge or dull tool. Arbor Milling can create an untempered martensitic layer on the surface of heat-treated alloy steels, about 0.001 in thick. Other materials are affected very little by arbor milling.

== Process conditions ==
Shown are the suggested ranges for cutting speeds and feed rates using high speed tool steel under dry cutting conditions at a 0.015 in depth of cut. Generally cutting speeds are lower for hard materials, higher for soft materials. Both cutting speeds and feed rates can be substantially increased when coolants are used and carbide tooling is substituted for steel tooling. Typical Speeds and Feeds

Workpiece Material	Hardness (Hardness Brinell scale)	Cutting Speed (sfpm)	Feed Rate (ipt)
Aluminum	70 to 125	300 to 500	0.006 to 0.010
Brass	60 to 100	110 to 275	0.007 to 0.009
Cast Iron	250 to 320	30 to 55	0.005 to 0.006
Mild Steel	275 to 325	60 to 80	0.006
Stainless Steel	275 to 325	40 to 55	0.006
Plastics	...	150 to 350	0.006

== Lubrication and cooling ==
Due to high cutting speeds a cutting fluid is required to lubricate and cool the tool and workpiece. The fluids can increase tool life, cutting speeds, and the quality of the finished surface. There are three common cutting fluids: mineral, synthetic, and water-soluble oils. These fluids can be applied by spraying, misting, or flooding the workpiece.

Fluids and applications
Workpeice	Cutting Fluid	Application method
Aluminum	None, mineral oil, fatty oil	Spray, flood
Brass	Mineral oil, specialty fluid	Spray, flood
Cast Iron	Soluble oil, chemical and synthetic oil, none	Spray, flood
Mild Steel	Chemical and synthetic oil, soluble oil	Spray, flood
Stainless Steel	Sulferized mineral oil, fally soluble oil, chemical and synthetic oil	Spray, flood
Plastics	Mineral oil, soluble oil, cold air, none	Spray, flood, air jet

== See also ==
- Metalworking
- Milling cutter
- Machining
- Horizontal boring machine
- CNC pocket milling
