= Frederick W. Howe =

American machine tool inventor

Frederick Webster Howe (28 August 1822 – 25 April 1891) was an American machine tool innovator and inventor. He was described as 'the Henry Maudslay of America' in recognition of his innovations.
