= 2.5D (machining) =

A 2.5D part that can be cut one contour at a time

A part that requires smoothly cutting in 3 dimensions to machine

A part that can be cut by a 2D cutting machine such as a laser cutter

In machining, 2.5D refers to a shape which is composed of flat surfaces at varying depths. Such a shape can be machined by a cutting tool that can cut freely in a flat plane, but must change its depth independently. It is district from 2D shapes, which can be cut by a laser or water jet, and 3D shapes, which contain surfaces that are non-planar to each other and require smooth cutting in three dimensions.

2.5D shapes may be used as approximations of 3D parts during machining due to easier tool path programming, faster cutting time, and simpler tooling.

== Applications ==
Programming optimized cutting tool paths for 2.5D objects is much easier than finding optimized tool paths for true 3D objects, which is an NP-hard combinatorial optimization problem. Cutting a 2.5D object is also faster and requires simpler tooling. These factors mean 2.5D machining is often used during rough milling, when the bulk of the material is removed, before the more difficult 3D milling process begins. 2.5D objects can be machined on a 3-axis milling machine, and do not require any of the features of a higher-axis machine to produce.

A 2.5D machine, also called a two-and-a-half-axis mill, possesses the capability to translate in all three axes but can perform the cutting operation only in two of the three axes at a time due to hardware or software limitations, or a machine that has a solenoid instead of a true, linear Z axis. A typical example involves an XY table that positions for each hole center, where the spindle (Z-axis) then completes a fixed cycle for drilling by plunging and retracting axially. Drilling and tapping centers are inexpensive, limited-duty machining centers that began as a 2.5-axis market category, although many late-model ones are 3-axis because the software and hardware costs have dropped with advancing technology.
