= Process management =

Process management may refer to:

- Business process management
  - Business Process Management Journal
  - Dynamic business process management
  - International Conference on Business Process Management
  - Social business process management
- Management process
- Manufacturing process management
- Process-based management
- Process management (computing)
  - Distributed operating system#Process management
- Process management (project management)
- Process safety management

== See also ==
- Information Processing and Management, an academic journal
