= Pencil milling =

Pencil toolpath diagram

Pencil milling diagram

Pencil milling is a cleanup toolpath generated by computer-aided manufacturing (CAM) programs to machine internal corners and fillets with smaller radius tools to remove the remaining material that are inaccessible with larger tools used for previous roughing, semi-finishing, and finishing toolpaths. The name comes from the way that a pencil could naturally be drawn along these corners. It is sometimes called a rolling ball toolpath.

Often a constant step-over passes are derived from single pencil pass to create parallel pencil passes that are very good for cleaning up corners and fillets where excess material remains from a bigger cutter.

== Generating pencil toolpaths ==
There are several alternate algorithms for generating pencil passes. The method most commonly published in the academic literature involves creating tool surface offsets of the model surfaces and intersecting them to find the common line where the cutter would be in contact with two surfaces at once. An example of this implementation uses the ZMap method described by Park, et al.
