= Raster passes =

Raster passes are the most basic of all machining strategies for the finishing or semi-finishing of a part during computer-aided manufacturing (CAM). In raster passes machining the milling cutter moves along curves on the cutter location surface (CL surface) obtained by intersecting the CL surface with vertical, parallel planes. Many CAM systems implement this strategy by sampling cutter location points on these curves by calculating intersection points of the CL surface and as many vertical lines as needed to approximate the curve to the desired accuracy.
