= Process management (project management) =

Concept in project management

In civil engineering and project management, process management is the management of "systematic series of activities directed towards causing an end result such that one or more inputs will be acted upon to create one or more outputs".

Process management offers project organizations a means of applying the same quality improvement and defect reduction techniques used in business and manufacturing processes by taking a process view of project activity; modeling discrete activities and high-level processes.

== Overview ==
The term process management usually refers to the management of engineering processes and project management processes where a process is a collection of related, structured tasks that produce a specific service or product to address a certain goal for a particular organization, actor or set of actors.

Processes can be executed with procedures. They can be described as a sequence of steps that can execute a process and their value lies in that they are an accepted method of accomplishing a consistent performance or results.

Process management provides engineering and project managers with a means of systemically thinking of project organizations, semantics concepts and logical frameworks that allow project activities to be planned, executed, analyzed and facilitate learning.

In order for process management as defined to deliver consistent performance, it requires definition, elimination of non-value-added activities, continuous improvement, project stakeholder focus and team based approach. Mitchell (2016) notes that managing processes across divisional and organizational boundaries requires a more flexible management strategy as well as close cooperation among managers in diverse functional and operational units to ensure that the process flow is not interrupted by conflicts over lines of authority.

== History ==
Process management originated as part of the manufacturing-based application of statistical quality control movement in the late 1920s and early 1930s. What is relatively new, however, is the transition of process management methods from a manufacturing environment to a total company orientation and project management.

Process management in the context of project management or engineering represents a change from the traditional concept of organizational authority using hierarchies and organizational structure to one requiring flexibility to ensure efficient process workflows. Mitchell (2016) notes that managing processes across divisional and organizational boundaries requires a more flexible management strategy as well as close cooperation among managers in diverse functional and operational units to ensure that the process flow is not interrupted by conflicts over lines of authority.

Cooper, et al. note that manufacturing has been "a constant reference point and a source of innovation in construction". There is a new phenomenon occurring within the construction sector that is based upon the development and use of fundamental core management processes to improve the efficiency of the industry.

== Topics ==
=== The notion of process ===
In the field of process management the notion of process, according to Mitchell (2016), can be characterized by:

- Why become a project management professional?
- Comprehensive program management.

These concepts provides management with the following:

- A way of thinking systematically about the behavior of people at work in an organizational setting.
- A vocabulary of terms, concepts, theories, and methodologies that allow work experiences to be clearly analyzed, shared, and discussed.
- Techniques for dealing with many of the problems that commonly occur in the work setting

Process management in this context requires engineering knowledge, management activities and skill sets whereas business processes or manufacturing processes require operations management activities, and skill sets.

=== Tools and models ===
Process models are 'an effective way to show how a process works'. Project management process modeling tools provide managers and engineering professionals with the ability to model their processes, implement and execute those models, and refine the models based on actual performance. The result is that business process modeling tools can provide transparency into project management processes, as well as the centralization of project organization process models and execution metrics.
A number of modelling/systems analysis techniques exist such as data flow diagrams (DFD), HIPO model (hierarchy + input-process-output), data modeling and IDEF0 (integration definition language 0 for function modelling) process modelling technique.

=== Threaded processes ===
A process activity that is concurrent or simultaneously executing can be termed a thread.

=== ISO 9000 ===
ISO 9000 promotes the process approach to managing an organization.

...promotes the adoption of a process approach when developing, implementing and improving the effectiveness of a quality management system, to enhance customer satisfaction by meeting customer requirements.

== See also ==
- Business process management
- Management process
- Process-based management
- Process management
- Program management
- Project management
- Total quality management
