= CIFMS =

Continuous Improvement and Focused Monitoring System is a process management and quality management concept, which offers companies "quick wins" benefits, which enable them to produce high quality products with shorter lead-time.

A CIFMS is not a general software application that can be readily used for any given manufacturing company, it is a uniquely designed system specifically tailored to a given company guided by a method. Therefore the most crucial process in developing and implementing an efficient CIFMS is selecting a design method which brings forth a multi-criteria decision analysis (MCDM) problem with varied degrees of interdependencies among the decision components.

A key principle of an effective Continuous Improvement and Focused Monitoring System is input and feedback from a diverse group of stakeholders.

== See also ==
- Continuous improvement
- Business process management
- Lean manufacturing
- Total quality management
- Manufacturing process management
