= Green Lake Jewelry Works =

Coordinates: 47.708744°N 122.320963°W

- Company type: Private
- Industry: Jewelry
- Founded: Seattle, Washington (1996)
- Founder: Jim Tuttle; Jytte Tuttle
- Headquarters: Seattle, Washington
- Number of locations: 2
- Key people: Jim Tuttle, owner; Krista Tuttle, sales executive
- Revenue: $10,000,000 (2018)
- Number of employees: 67 (2016); 32 (2016)
- Website: www.greenlakejewelry.com

Green Lake Jewelry Works is an American jewelry designer, manufacturer, and retailer based in Seattle. Selling mostly custom made jewelry, the company is known for a customer experience of personalized contact with traditional artisans that is profitably scaled up to a relatively large business operation, made possible by its use of computer-aided design and manufacturing (CAD/CAM), in combination with effective use of e-commerce technology. They maintain a relatively small physical inventory that is augmented by a "virtual inventory" of renderings of their offerings. The company's sales volume grew quickly from about $2 million per year in the years 2003–2005 to over $7 million for 2006, passing $10+ million by 2018.

== History ==
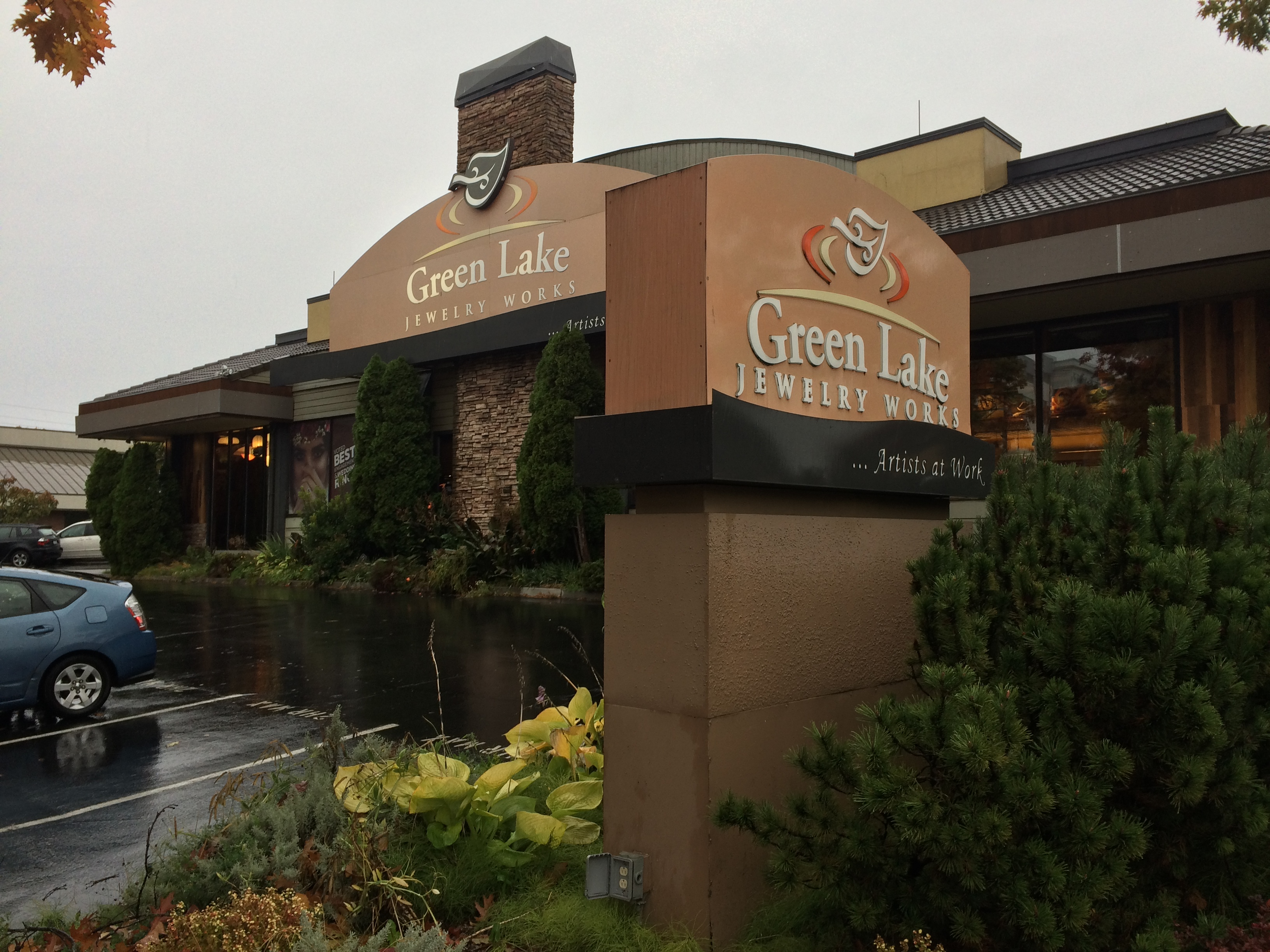
The Seattle location, near Northgate Mall

Jim and Jytte Tuttle opened Green Lake Jewelry Works in 1996 as a 500-foot store in the Green Lake neighborhood of Seattle. In 2006, Green Lake Jewelry Works had 35 employees and moved into a 7,200-foot location in the Northgate neighborhood of Seattle. As of early 2012, Green Lake Jewelry Works had almost 50 artists on staff and has a biography page for each artist online. In 2016 Green Lake Jewelry Works opened a second 5,750 square foot location in Bellevue, Washington. As in the existing Seattle location, the jewelers and jewelry designers built the majority of the showcases and hand painted elaborate designs on the floor. In 2019, Green Lake Jewelry Works added the local Seattle Jewelry business, Facèré Jewelry Art Gallery, to each location.

== Operations ==
In 2010, 90% of Green Lake Jewelry Works's business was custom pieces, primarily engagement and wedding rings. Green Lake Jewelry Works uses computer-aided design and manufacturing (CAD/CAM) as well as traditional techniques like hand engraving to produce its jewelry. In 2009, the retailer was the largest user of Matrix software by Gemvision, CAD/CAM software for jewelry design. CAD/CAM, the process of designing three-dimensional objects using a computer and manufacturing them with a computer-controlled machine has long been used in other industries and is gaining importance in the jewelry industry, which still primarily using traditional techniques of craftsmanship.
