= Business-oriented architecture =

Business-oriented architecture is an enterprise architecture approach for designing and implementing strategically aligned business models.

== Business models ==
The current theory of BOA allows a company to design their business and operating model based on integration of critical business architecture components, such as capabilities, processes, customers, employees, channels, and products with automation through IT application, data, and technology architectures.

Gartner defines BOA as a combination of business process management (BPM) and service-oriented architecture (SOA). BOA connects the technical, IT-facing tools of SOA with the core process improvement functions of BPM.

The current theory of BOA allows a company to manage, automate, and integrate critical processes, applications and functions, legacy applications, and components in a unified interoperability BOA to achieve business goals.

The current architecture is built on a set of principles and methodologies for achieving speed to market, business agility, and lower total cost of ownership. It focuses on the business, the business model, business processes, intellectual property and customers.

== Strategic management ==
BOA is driven by business goals, business objectives, customer expectations, and definitions of business challenges. BOA systems let clients "design, deploy, and operate entire business workflows or operating models" by integrating several technologies and functions.

== Management ==
BOA is focused on managing and integrating critical business processes. It includes:

- objectives and strategy
- assessment
- solution modeling
- solution analysis
- implementation
- analysis and optimization

When considered as a mix of multiple disciplines—including BPM, BI, and SOA—business oriented architecture involves the IT-facing components of SOA (directory services, data services, application services, security services, partner services), the business-facing, process-improvement components of BPM (business event monitoring, human activity management, process choreography, simulation, and optimization), and analytical disciplines (BI, predictive, and rules) for end-to-end application and operating models.

== Benefits ==
- Successful BOA leads to faster, cheaper, and more effective process improvement, application development and deployment, and increased integration of the enterprise.
- New BOA structures integrate legacy applications and assets in a single interoperable framework for increased leverage, reuse, and longevity of assets.
- Unified Interoperability models integrate assets and solutions across a network for the creation of virtualized operating models and solutions.

== See also ==
- Unified interoperability
- Pneuron
