= BPM Everywhere =

BPM Everywhere (BPME) represents a strategy for coping, and possibly exploiting, the disruption that is anticipated as a result of structural changes due to technical progression known as the Internet of Things (IoT). IoT will substantially increase the number of devices connected together and will increase the complexity of those connections.

IoT is expected to cause the practitioners of Business Process Management (BPM), a well-established discipline concerned with management and optimizing an organizations processes, to face a number of critical issues.

In November 2014, IT Industry magazine, Information Age said that "Simply because they connect, communicate and analyse doesn’t make an IoT thing productive or useful. To be impactful, IoT technologies need to solve real problems that typically involve multiple collaborating activities that include people, systems, and 'things'."

According to Dr. Setrag Khoshafian, a leading expert in Business Process Management (BPM), "the real transformation of the IoT will occur through the 'end-to-end digitization of processes.'"

BPME is an approach that leverages traditional business process modeling techniques together with process mining and process analytics in order to automate and distribute the job of discovering, measuring, and improving the processes. Nathaniel Palmer, leading analyst in the field of BPM and Director of the Workflow Management Coalition (WfMC), sees BPME as a next-generation application development platform, combining the ability to quickly adapt processes with the ability to more cost-effectively design and build better applications Palmer views this as one most significant shifts in the way applications are currently built, as well as shift for 3-tier to 4-tier architectures.

The impact of IoT on the business world in the coming decade has been compared to the impact of smart phones on the previous decade. BPME is one among several potential resolution strategies, which includes Social internet of Things.

Surendra Reddy, CEO of Quantiply said "People, Things and Processes that run in this connected world leave behind vast digital footprints of these processes, things, people, interactions, and daily rhythms of the society. As a result, the Internet is a powerful tool to persuade, connect and engage humans and things alike serving as the common fabric of interconnection among everything". Whilst Nathaniel Palmer suggests "Not even the emergence of the Web and Internet-based “digital native” business models can compare with the level of intimacy now available with your customers".

== See also ==
- Business Process Management
- Workflow Management Coalition
