= Direct numerical control =

Direct numerical control (DNC), also known as distributed numerical control (also DNC), is a common manufacturing term for networking CNC machine tools. On some CNC machine controllers, the available memory is too small to contain the machining program (for example machining complex surfaces), so in this case the program is stored in a separate computer and sent directly to the machine, one block at a time. If the computer is connected to a number of machines it can distribute programs to different machines as required. Usually, the manufacturer of the control provides suitable DNC software. However, if this provision is not possible, some software companies provide DNC applications that fulfill the purpose. DNC networking or DNC communication is always required when CAM programs are to run on some CNC machine control.

Wireless DNC is also used in place of hard-wired versions. Controls of this type are very widely used in industries with significant sheet metal fabrication, such as the automotive, appliance, and aerospace industries.

== History ==
=== 1950s-1970s ===
Programs had to be walked to NC controls, generally on paper tape. NC controls had paper tape readers precisely for this purpose. Many companies were still punching programs on paper tape well into the 1980s, more than twenty-five years after its elimination in the computer industry.

=== 1980s ===
The focus in the 1980s was mainly on reliably transferring NC programs between a host computer and the control. The Host computers would frequently be Sun Microsystems, HP, Prime, DEC or IBM type computers running a variety of CAD/CAM software. DNC companies offered machine tool links using rugged proprietary terminals and networks. For example, DLog offered an x86 based terminal, and NCPC had one based on the 6809. The host software would be responsible for tracking and authorising NC program modifications. Depending on program size, for the first time operators had the opportunity to modify programs at the DNC terminal. No time was lost due to broken tapes, and if the software was correctly used, an operator running incorrect or out of date programs became a thing of the past.

Older controls frequently had no port capable of receiving programs such as an RS-232 or RS-422 connector. In these cases, a device known as a Behind The Reader or BTR card was used. The connection between the control's tape reader and the internal processor was interrupted by a microprocessor based device which emulated the paper tape reader's signals, but which had a serial port connected to the DNC system. As far as the control was concerned, it was receiving from the paper tape unit as it always had; in fact it was the BTR or Reader Emulation card which was transmitting. A switch was frequently added to permit the paper tape reader to be used as a backup.

=== 1990s to present ===
The PC explosion in the late 1980s and early 1990s signalled the end of the road for proprietary DNC terminals. With some exceptions, CNC manufacturers began migrating to PC-based controls running DOS, Windows or OS/2 which could be linked in to existing networks using standard protocols. Customers began migrating away from expensive minicomputer and workstation based CAD/CAM toward more cost-effective PC-based solutions. Users began to demand more from their DNC systems than secure upload/download and editing. PC-based systems which could accomplish these tasks based on standard networks began to be available at minimal or no cost. In some cases, users no longer needed a DNC "expert" to implement shop floor networking, and could do it themselves. However, the task can still be a challenge based on the CNC Control wiring requirements, parameters and NC program format.

To remain competitive, therefore, DNC companies moved their offerings upmarket into DNC Networking, Shop Floor Control or SFC, Manufacturing Execution Systems or MES. These terms encompass concepts such as real-time Machine Monitoring, Graphics, Tool Management, Traveler Management and Scheduling. Instead of merely acting as a repository for programs, DNC systems aim to give operators at the machine an integrated view of all the information (both textual and graphical) they require in order to carry out a manufacturing operation, and give management timely information as to the progress of each step. DNC systems are frequently directly integrated with corporate CAD/CAM, ERP and Computer-aided Process Planning CAPP systems.

== Special protocols ==
A challenge when interfacing into machine tools is that in some cases special protocols are used. Two well-known examples are Mazak's Mazatrol and Heidenhain's LSV2 protocol. Many DNC systems offer support for these protocols. Another protocol is DNC2 which is found on Fanuc controls. DNC2 allows advanced interchange of data with the control, such as tooling offsets, tool life information and machine status as well as automated transfer without operator intervention.

== Machine monitoring ==
One of the issues involved in machine monitoring is whether or not it can be accomplished automatically in a practical way. In the 1980s monitoring was typically done by having a menu on the DNC terminal where the operator had to manually indicate what was being done by selecting from a menu, which has obvious drawbacks. There have been advances in passive monitoring systems where the machine condition can be determined by hardware attached in such a way as not to interfere with machine operations (and potentially void warranties). Many modern controls allow external applications to query their status using a special protocol. MTConnect is one prominent attempt to augment the existing world of proprietary systems with an open-source, industry-standard protocol using XML schemas. The end goal being to achieve higher levels of manufacturing business intelligence and workflow automation.

== Alternatives ==
Smaller facilities will typically use a portable PC or laptop to avoid the expense of a fully networked DNC system. In the past Facit Walk Disk and a similar device from Mazak were very popular.
