= Dynamic business process management =

Dynamic business process management (dynamic BPM) is a solution which enables enterprises to react to changing conditions of operation (both interior and/or exterior) and cater to the individual needs of their clients in a timely fashion (and even provide a practically instant response in case of critical conditions), in accordance with process adaptations executed in real time by their direct process owners with access to the codified knowledge of their enterprises. The concept of a dynamic BPM is an extension of traditional (static) business process management tailored to learning organizations.

== Process execution should guarantee evolutionary flexibility ==
Dynamic BPM provides an organizational and technical environment, allowing the process owners to modify or transform their processes independent of substantial IT support and a software development or maintenance lifecycle.

Processes should be defined and implemented in such a way as to enable supplements to, or even overhauls of, process activities, as authorized by direct process owners (e.g. contract managers or project coordinators). The authority to change executed processes on an ongoing basis should not be limited, as it had been thus far, to process leaders. Instead, it should also be given to the aforementioned groups. Direct process owners should also be allowed access to a process-driven application in order to execute activities, actions and even whole elementary processes not included in the standard process.

== Processes are considered completed only after having been documented ==
The implementation of dynamic BPM should provide the inclusion of process definitions in the executive process-driven application, as well as to ensure that processes are considered completed only after having been documented, without the burden of excess reporting.

== Comprehensiveness and continuity ==
The implementation of dynamic BPM should include the whole standard process along with vendors and subcontractors, with the aim of minimizing the inclusive costs and total supplies, while simultaneously reducing the total execution time. This approach considerably broadens the range of available options of raising effectiveness, as well as often the time of execution by means of optimization, which takes into account those activities which lie outside the scope of a single enterprise (e.g. deliveries, warranty services) within a single value-adding process.

== Implementing dynamic BPM ==
Implementing dynamic business process management without the aid of IT solutions is impossible, since it would require a considerably larger amount of work to cope with the ongoing management of executed processes. The rapid evolutionary jump from traditional BPMS solutions to dynamic BPMS solutions enables users to apply process management to those processes which are hard to structure, and therefore necessitate a dynamic approach, usually comprising the majority of an enterprise's processes.
