= Traunreut =

- Town
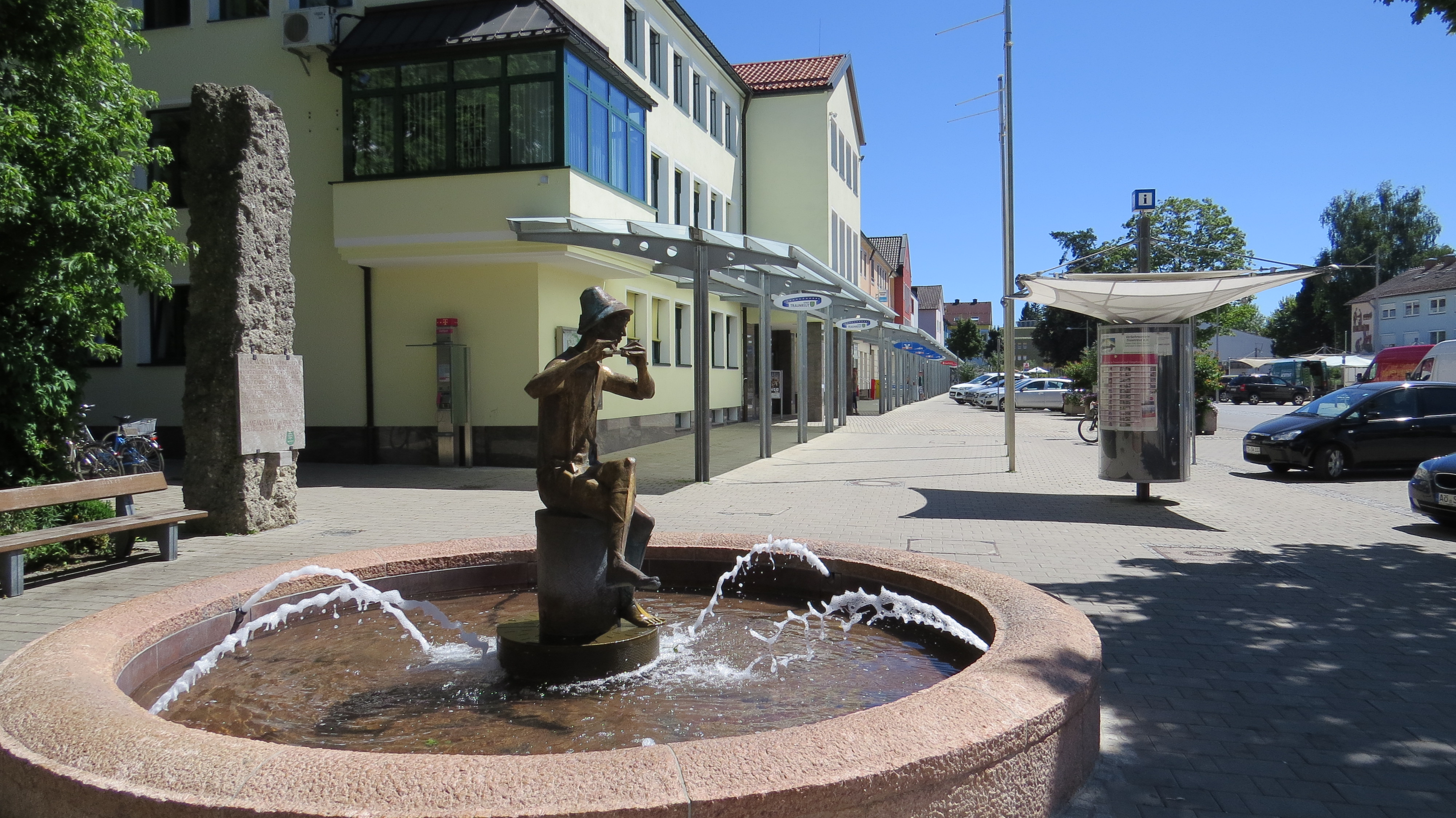
- Town hall with the fountain

- Coat of arms

- Location of Traunreut within Traunstein district
- Interactive map of Traunreut
- Location within Germany Location within Bavaria
- Coordinates: 47°58′N 12°35′E
- Country: Germany
- State: Bavaria
- Admin. region: Oberbayern
- District: Traunstein

Government
  - Mayor (2020–26): Hans-Peter Dangschat (CSU)

Area
  - Total: 45.05 km^{2} (17.39 sq mi)
- Elevation: 552 m (1,811 ft)

Population (2025-12-31)
  - Total: 20,381
  - Density: 452.4/km^{2} (1,172/sq mi)
- Time zone: UTC+01:00 (CET)
  - Summer (DST): UTC+02:00 (CEST)
- Postal codes: 83301
- Dialling codes: 08669
- Vehicle registration: TS
- Website: www.traunreut.de

Traunreut (German pronunciation: [tʁaʊ̯nˈʁɔɪ̯t]; Central Bavarian: Traunreit) is a town in southeastern Bavaria, Germany in the Traunstein district. It is located at 47°58′N 12°35′E. Traunreut lies in the heart of the Chiemgau region between Munich and Salzburg, approximately 10 km east of the Chiemsee, 25 km north of the Alps, and 35 km west of Salzburg. Its population is approximately 21,000. Companies present in the area include Siteco Beleuchtungstechnik GmbH (lighting fixtures), Dr. Johannes Heidenhain GmbH (linear and rotary encoders, gaging systems, CNC controls), Bosch and Siemens Household Appliances, BSH (household equipment, high-tech stoves and microwaves), and other midsize firms.

== History ==
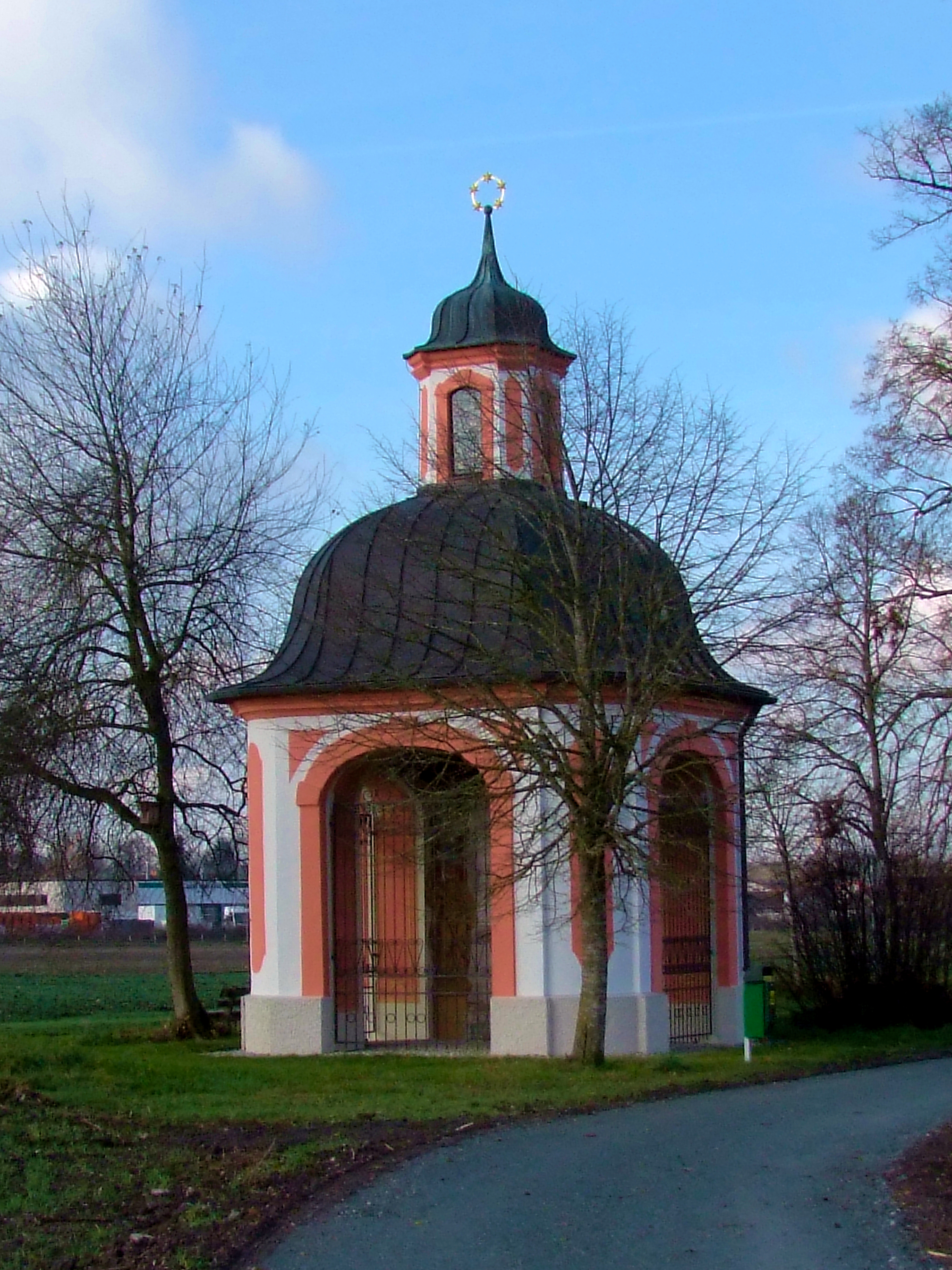
Johann Nepomuk Chapel

In 1938 an ordnance factory, known as "MUNA St. Georgen", was built on the outskirts of the village of St. Georgen, at the present location of Traunreut. After World War II, with the factory closed, ethnic German expellees from their settlements in Central and Eastern Europe settled in the abandoned grounds, and toxic material was removed from the area.

The municipality of Traunreut was founded in 1950. In 1960, Traunreut became a town, and in 1978, after the German local government reform, the then independent neighboring villages of Traunwalchen, Stein - Sankt Georgen and Pierling came under the administration of Traunreut.

== Notable people ==
- Alois Glück (born 1940), CSU politician
- Ralph Möbius (1950–1996), (= Rio Reiser) composer, singer and actor lived in Traunreut from 1951 to 1956, his father was an engineer at Siemens
- Peter Ramsauer (born 1954), German politician (CSU), Member of the Bundestag since 1990
