= Heidenhain =

German machine tool numerical control manufacturer

Coordinates: 47°57′50.40″N 12°35′40.56″E

Dr. Johannes Heidenhain GmbH
- Founded: 1889
- Headquarters: Traunreut, Germany
- Products: measuring systems, numerical controls
- Number of employees: 7000
- Website: www.heidenhain.de

Dr. Johannes Heidenhain GmbH is a privately owned enterprise located in Traunreut, Germany. Heidenhain manufactures numerical controls for machine tools, as well as mechatronic measuring devices for length and angle.

Their linear and angle encoders are built for use in automated machines and systems, particularly in machine tools.

== History ==
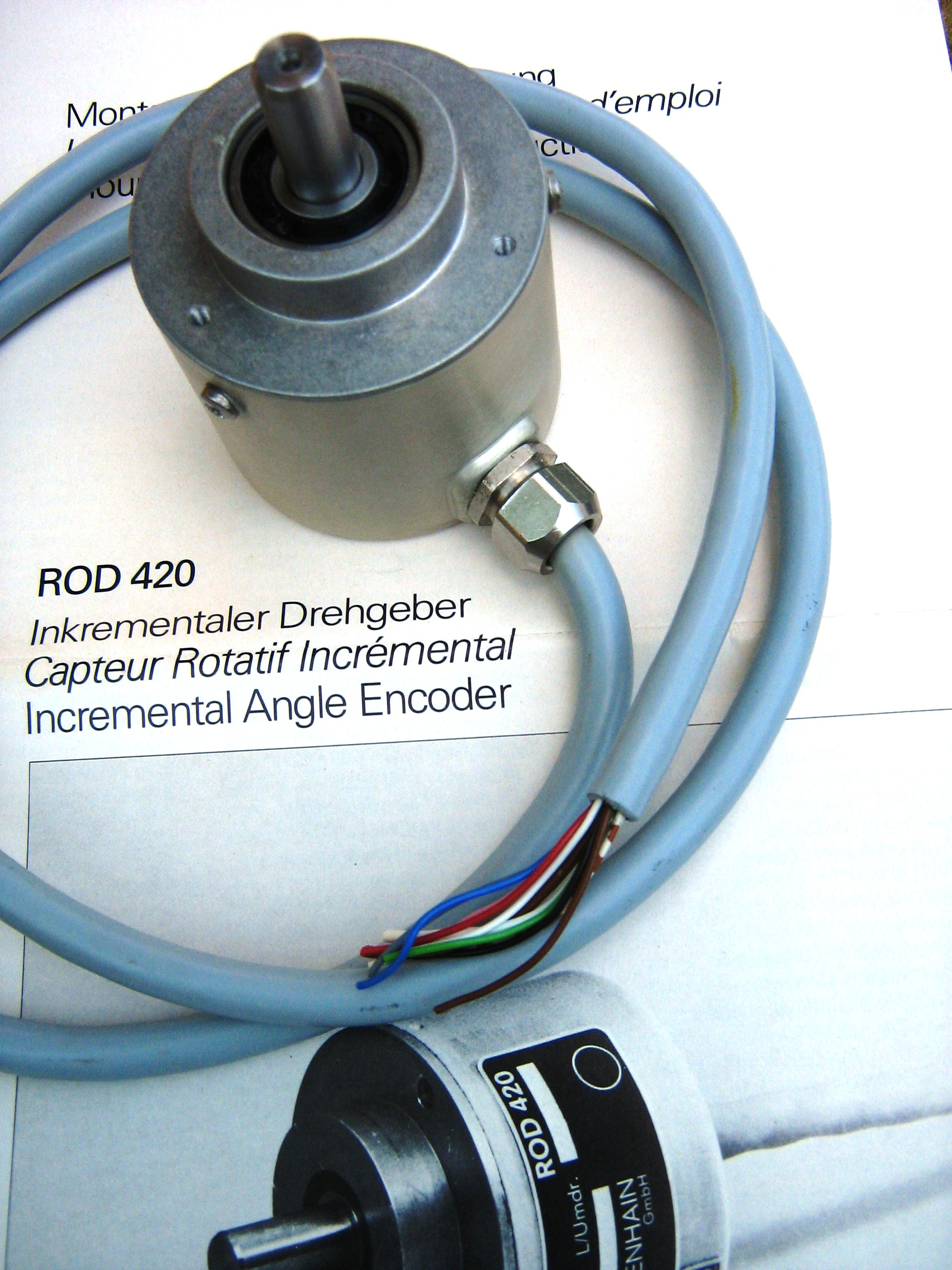
Encoder ROD 420

The company began as a metal etching factory founded in Berlin by Wilhelm Heidenhain in 1889 that manufactured templates, company plaques, product labels, and scales.

In 1928 Heidenhain invented the Metallur process. This lead-sulfide copying process made it possible for the first time to make exact copies of an original grating on a metal surface for industrial use. By 1943, Heidenhain was producing linear scales with accuracy of ± 15 μm and circular scale disks with accuracy of ± 3 angular seconds.

After World War II, in 1948, Dr. Johannes Heidenhain, a pupil of Otto Hahn, founded the present company in Traunreut.

Its invention of the Diadur process enabled it to apply very fine structures of chromium on suitable substrates, such as glass.

The Diadur process was the basis in 1952 for adding optical position measuring devices for machine tools to the product program. These were followed in 1961 by photoelectrically scanned linear and angle encoders.

In 1968 Heidenhain manufactured its first digital readouts.

The first Heidenhain numerical control was launched in 1976.

In 1987, a linear encoder series operating on the principle of light interference was introduced. It permitted measuring steps as fine as one nanometer.

According to Heidenhain, in 2006 the company had regional sales locations in 43 countries and employed about 7,000 people, 2,600 of whom worked in the main facility in Traunreut, Germany.

By the end of 2006 the company had manufactured about 10.5 million linear or angle encoders, 420,000 position displays and nearly 200,000 CNC controls.

== Critique of Activities in Russia ==
After the 2022 Russian invasion of Ukraine, the Chief Executive Leadership Institute of the US Yale University criticized that Heidenhain was still operating in Russia through a third party, which was not disclosed publicly. Heidenhain products are used in the Russian arms industry.
