= Business process management =

Business management discipline

Business process management (BPM) is the discipline in which people use various methods to discover, model, analyze, measure, improve, optimize, and automate business processes. Any combination of methods used to manage a company's business processes is BPM. Processes can be structured and repeatable or unstructured and variable. Though not required, enabling technologies are often used with BPM.

As an approach, BPM treats processes as important organizational assets that must be understood, managed, and continuously improved in order to create and deliver value to clients or customers. This approach closely resembles other total quality management or continual improvement process methodologies.

ISO 9000:2015 promotes the process approach to managing an organization.

...promotes the adoption of a process approach when developing, implementing and improving the effectiveness of a quality management system, to enhance customer satisfaction by meeting customer requirements.

BPM proponents also claim that this approach can be supported, or enabled, through technology. Therefore, multiple BPM articles and scholars frequently discuss BPM from one of two viewpoints: people and/or technology.

BPM streamlines business processing by automating workflows; while RPA automates tasks by recording a set of repetitive activities performed by humans. Organizations maximize their business automation leveraging both technologies to achieve better results.

== Definitions ==
The Workflow Management Coalition, BPM.com and several other sources use the following definition:

Business process management (BPM) is a discipline involving any combination of modeling, automation, execution, control, measurement and optimization of business activity flows, in support of enterprise goals, spanning systems, employees, customers and partners within and beyond the enterprise boundaries.

The Association of Business Process Management Professionals defines BPM as:

Business process management (BPM) is a disciplined approach to identify, design, execute, document, measure, monitor, and control both automated and non-automated business processes to achieve consistent, targeted results aligned with an organization's strategic goals. BPM involves the deliberate, collaborative and increasingly technology-aided definition, improvement, innovation, and management of end-to-end business processes that drive business results, create value, and enable an organization to meet its business objectives with more agility. BPM enables an enterprise to align its business processes to its business strategy, leading to effective overall company performance through improvements of specific work activities either within a specific department, across the enterprise, or between organizations.

Gartner defines business process management as:

"the discipline of managing processes (rather than tasks) as the means for improving business performance outcomes and operational agility. Processes span organizational boundaries, linking together people, information flows, systems, and other assets to create and deliver value to customers and constituents."

It is common to confuse BPM with a BPM suite (BPMS). BPM is a professional discipline done by people, whereas a BPMS is a technological suite of tools designed to help the BPM professionals accomplish their goals. BPM should also not be confused with an application or solution developed to support a particular process. Suites and solutions represent ways of automating business processes, but automation is only one aspect of BPM.

== Evolution and scope ==
Business process management has evolved from earlier management and quality movements, including total quality management and business process reengineering, into a broader organisational discipline concerned with the end-to-end governance, performance, and continuous improvement of processes.

Contemporary academic and professional literature commonly defines BPM not only as a set of modelling or automation techniques, but as a management approach that integrates process design, execution, monitoring, and optimisation with organisational strategy, governance, and information systems.

In this sense, BPM differs from isolated process improvement initiatives by emphasising sustained organisational capability, cross-functional coordination, and continuous improvement over time, rather than one-off redesign efforts.

== Comparison with program management ==
It can be differentiated from program management in that program management is concerned with managing a group of inter-dependent projects. From another viewpoint, process management includes program management. In project management, process management is the use of a repeatable process to improve the outcome of the project.

== Comparison with project management ==
A key distinction between process management and project management lies in repeatability and predictability. If the structure and sequence of work are unique, then it is a project. In business process management, a workflow can vary from case to case due to gateways, conditions, and business rules. The key is predictability: no matter how many forks in the road, we know all of them in advance, and we understand the conditions for the process to take one route or another. If this condition is met, we are dealing with a process.

== Changes ==
The concept of business process may be as traditional as concepts of tasks, department, production, and outputs, arising from job shop scheduling problems in the early 20th century. The management and improvement approach as of 2010, with formal definitions and technical modeling, has been around since the early 1990s (see business process modeling). Note that the term "business process" is sometimes used by IT practitioners as synonymous with the management of middleware processes or with integrating application software tasks.

Although BPM initially focused on the automation of business processes through information technology, the discipline has evolved to encompass human-driven processes in which human interaction takes place in series or in parallel with automated tasks. For example, workflow management systems can assign individual steps requiring deploying human intuition or judgment to relevant humans and other tasks in a workflow to a relevant automated system.

More recent variations such as "human interaction management" are concerned with the interaction between human workers performing a task.

As of 2010, technology has allowed the coupling of BPM with other methodologies, such as Six Sigma. Some BPM tools such as SIPOCs, process flows, RACIs, CTQs and histograms allow users to:

- visualize – functions and processes
- measure – determine the appropriate measure to determine success
- analyze – compare the various simulations to determine an optimal improvement
- improve – select and implement the improvement
- control – deploy this implementation and by use of user-defined dashboards monitor the improvement in real time and feed the performance information back into the simulation model in preparation for the next improvement iteration
- re-engineer – revamp the processes from scratch for better results

This brings with it the benefit of being able to simulate changes to business processes based on real-world data (not just on assumed knowledge). Also, the coupling of BPM to industry methodologies allows users to continually streamline and optimize the process to ensure that it is tuned to its market need.

As of 2012 research on BPM has paid increasing attention to the compliance of business processes. Although a key aspect of business processes is flexibility, as business processes continuously need to adapt to changes in the environment, compliance with business strategy, policies, and government regulations should also be ensured. The compliance aspect in BPM is highly important for governmental organizations. As of 2010 BPM approaches in a governmental context largely focus on operational processes and knowledge representation. There have been a number of technical studies on operational business processes in the public and private sectors, but researchers rarely take legal compliance activities into account—for instance, the legal implementation processes in public-administration bodies.

== Life-cycle ==
Business process management activities can be arbitrarily grouped into categories such as design, modeling, execution, monitoring, and optimization.

=== Design ===
Process design encompasses both the identification of existing processes and the design of "to-be" processes. Areas of focus include representation of the process flow, the factors within it, alerts and notifications, escalations, standard operating procedures, service level agreements, and task hand-over mechanisms. Whether or not existing processes are considered, the aim of this step is to ensure a correct and efficient new design.

The proposed improvement could be in human-to-human, human-to-system or system-to-system workflows, and might target regulatory, market, or competitive challenges faced by the businesses. Existing processes and design of a new process for various applications must synchronize and not cause a major outage or process interruption.

=== Modeling ===
Modeling takes the theoretical design and introduces combinations of variables (e.g., changes in rent or materials costs, which determine how the process might operate under different circumstances).

It may also involve running "what-if analysis"(Conditions-when, if, else) on the processes: "What if I have 75% of resources to do the same task?" "What if I want to do the same job for 80% of the current cost?".

=== Execution ===
Business process execution is broadly about enacting a discovered and modeled business process.

==== Business process ====
Enacting a business process is done manually or automatically or with a combination of manual and automated business tasks. Manual business processes are human-driven. Automated business processes are software-driven. Business process automation encompasses methods and software deployed for automating business processes.

==== Business process automation ====
Business process automation is performed and orchestrated at the business process layer or the consumer presentation layer of SOA Reference Architecture. BPM software suites such as BPMS or iBPMS or low-code platforms are positioned at the business process layer. While the emerging robotic process automation software performs business process automation at the presentation layer, therefore is considered non-invasive to and de-coupled from existing application systems.

One of the ways to automate processes is to develop or purchase an application that executes the required steps of the process; however, in practice, these applications rarely execute all the steps of the process accurately or completely. Another approach is to use a combination of software and human intervention; however this approach is more complex, making the documentation process difficult.

In response to these problems, companies have developed software that defines the full business process (as developed in the process design activity) in a computer language that a computer can directly execute. Process models can be run through execution engines that automate the processes directly from the model (e.g., calculating a repayment plan for a loan) or, when a step is too complex to automate, Business Process Modeling Notation (BPMN) provides front-end capability for human input. Compared to either of the previous approaches, directly executing a process definition can be more straightforward and therefore easier to improve. However, automating a process definition requires flexible and comprehensive infrastructure, which typically rules out implementing these systems in a legacy IT environment.

==== Business rules ====
Business rules have been used by systems to provide definitions for governing behavior, and a business rule engine can be used to drive process execution and resolution.

=== Monitoring ===
Monitoring encompasses the tracking of individual processes, so that information on their state can be easily seen, and statistics on the performance of one or more processes can be provided. An example of this tracking is being able to determine the state of a customer order (e.g. order arrived, awaiting delivery, invoice paid) so that problems in its operation can be identified and corrected.

In addition, this information can be used to work with customers and suppliers to improve their connected processes. Examples are the generation of measures on how quickly a customer order is processed or how many orders were processed in the last month. These measures tend to fit into three categories: cycle time, defect rate and productivity.

==== Business activity monitoring (BAM) ====
The degree of monitoring depends on what information the business wants to evaluate and analyze and how the business wants it monitored, in real-time, near real-time or ad hoc. Here, business activity monitoring (BAM) extends and expands the monitoring tools generally provided by BPMS.

==== Process mining ====
Process mining is a collection of methods and tools related to process monitoring. The aim of process mining is to analyze event logs extracted through process monitoring and to compare them with an a priori process model. Process mining allows process analysts to detect discrepancies between the actual process execution and the a priori model as well as to analyze bottlenecks.

==== Predictive business process monitoring ====
Predictive business process monitoring concerns the application of data mining, machine learning, and other forecasting techniques to predict what is going to happen with running instances of a business process, allowing to make forecasts of future cycle time, compliance issues, etc. Techniques for predictive business process monitoring include Support Vector Machines, Deep Learning approaches, and Random Forest.

=== Optimization ===
Process optimization includes retrieving process performance information from modeling or monitoring phase; identifying the potential or actual bottlenecks and the potential opportunities for cost savings or other improvements; and then, applying those enhancements in the design of the process. Process mining tools are able to discover critical activities and bottlenecks, creating greater business value.

=== Re-engineering ===
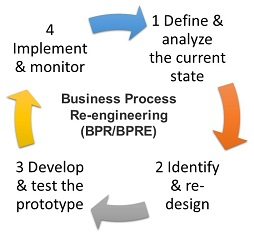
Business process re-engineering (BPR/BPRE) in a succinct way

Business process re-engineering (BPR) is a business management strategy originally pioneered in the early 1990s, focusing on the analysis and design of workflows and business processes within an organization. BPR aims to help organizations fundamentally rethink how they do their work in order to improve customer service, cut operational costs, and become world-class competitors.

BPR seeks to help companies radically restructure their organizations by focusing on the ground-up design of their business processes. According to early BPR proponent Thomas H. Davenport (1990), a business process is a set of logically related tasks performed to achieve a defined business outcome. Re-engineering emphasized a holistic focus on business objectives and how processes related to them, encouraging full-scale recreation of processes, rather than iterative optimization of sub-processes. BPR is influenced by technological innovations as industry players replace old methods of business operations with cost-saving innovative technologies such as automation that can radically transform business operations.

Business process re-engineering is also known as business process redesign, business transformation, or business process change management.

Organizational research suggests that participation in intensive BPR mapping projects can have ambivalent effects on the employees involved: while detailed visualization of "as-is" processes often empowers team members by revealing actionable improvement opportunities, it may simultaneously alienate them from their pre-existing line roles once the magnitude of systemic inefficiencies becomes visible. A longitudinal multi-company study by Huising (2019) documents how experienced managers, after building wall-sized process maps, voluntarily transitioned into peripheral change-management positions in order to drive reforms from outside the traditional hierarchy.

== Suites ==
A market has developed for enterprise software leveraging the business process management concepts to organize and automate processes. The recent convergence of this software from distinct pieces such as business rules engine, business process modelling, business activity monitoring and Human Workflow has given birth to integrated business process management suites. Forrester Research recognize the BPM suite space through three different lenses:

- Human-centric BPM
- Integration-centric BPM (enterprise service bus)
- Document-centric BPM (dynamic case management)

However, standalone integration-centric and document-centric offerings have matured into separate, standalone markets.

Rapid application development using no-code/low-code principles is becoming an ever prevalent feature of BPMS platforms. RAD enables businesses to deploy applications more quickly and more cost effectively, while also offering improved change and version management. Gartner notes that as businesses embrace these systems, their budgets rely less on the maintenance of existing systems and show more investment in growing and transforming them.

== Practice ==
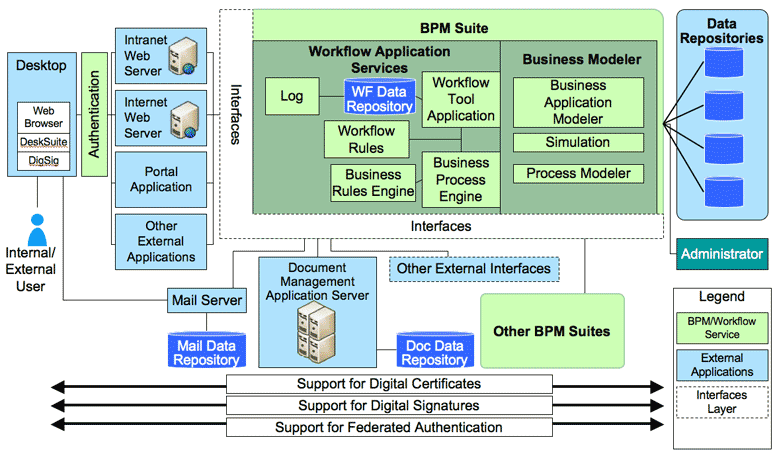
Example of Business Process Management (BPM) Service Pattern: This pattern shows how business process management (BPM) tools can be used to implement business processes through the orchestration of activities between people and systems.

While the steps can be viewed as a cycle, economic or time constraints are likely to limit the process to only a few iterations. This is often the case when an organization uses the approach for short to medium term objectives rather than trying to transform the organizational culture. True iterations are only possible through the collaborative efforts of process participants. In a majority of organizations, complexity requires enabling technology (see below) to support the process participants in these daily process management challenges.

To date, some organizations often start a BPM project or program with the objective of optimizing an area that has been identified as an area for improvement.

Currently, the international standards for the task have limited BPM to the application in the IT sector, and ISO/IEC 15944 covers the operational aspects of the business. However, some corporations with the culture of best practices do use standard operating procedures to regulate their operational process. Other standards are currently being worked upon to assist in BPM implementation (BPMN, enterprise architecture, Business Motivation Model).

=== Technology ===
BPM is now considered a critical component of operational intelligence (OI) solutions to deliver real-time, actionable information. This real-time information can be acted upon in a variety of ways – alerts can be sent or executive decisions can be made using real-time dashboards. OI solutions use real-time information to take automated action based on pre-defined rules so that security measures and or exception management processes can be initiated. Because "the size and complexity of daily tasks often requires the use of technology to model efficiently" when resources in technology became increasingly widespread with general availability to businesses to provide to their staff, "Many thought BPM as the bridge between Information Technology (IT) and Business."

There are four critical components of a BPM suite:

- Process engine – a robust platform for modeling and executing process-based applications, including business rules
- Business analytics – enable managers to identify business issues, trends, and opportunities with reports and dashboards and react accordingly
- Content management – provides a system for storing and securing electronic documents, images, and other files
- Collaboration tools – remove intra- and interdepartmental communication barriers through discussion forums, dynamic workspaces, and message boards

BPM also addresses a number of the critical IT issues underpinning these business drivers, including:

- Managing end-to-end, customer-facing processes
- Consolidating data and increasing visibility into and access to associated data and information
- Increasing the flexibility and functionality of current infrastructure and data
- Integrating with existing systems and leveraging service oriented architecture (SOA)
- Establishing a common language for business-IT alignment

Validation of BPMS is another technical issue that vendors and users must be aware of, if regulatory compliance is mandatory. The validation task could be performed either by an authenticated third party or by the users themselves. Either way, validation documentation must be generated. The validation document usually can either be published officially or retained by users.

=== Cloud computing BPM ===
Cloud computing business process management is the use of (BPM) tools that are delivered as software services (SaaS) over a network. Cloud BPM business logic is deployed on an application server and the business data resides in cloud storage.

==== Market ====
According to Gartner, 20% of all the "shadow business processes" are supported by BPM cloud platforms. Gartner refers to all the hidden organizational processes that are supported by IT departments as part of legacy business processes such as Excel spreadsheets, routing of emails using rules, phone calls routing, etc. These can, of course also be replaced by other technologies such as workflow and smart form software.

==== Benefits ====
The benefits of using cloud BPM services include removing the need and cost of maintaining specialized technical skill sets in-house and reducing distractions from an enterprise's main focus. It offers controlled IT budgeting and enables geographical mobility..

=== Internet of things ===
The emerging Internet of Things presents challenges for managing and controlling the flow of information across large numbers of connected devices. To address these challenges, approaches such as BPM Everywhere have been proposed, combining traditional business process management techniques with additional capabilities designed to support the coordination and automation of distributed devices.

== See also ==
- Application service provider
- Business intelligence
- Business object
- Business-oriented architecture
- Business process automation
- Business process orientation
- CIFMS
- Comparison of business integration software
- E-services
- Enterprise planning systems
- Human resource management system
- Integrated business planning
- International Conference on Business Process Management
- ISO 9001:2015
- ITIL
- Managed services
- Manufacturing process management
- Process architecture
- Process science
- Social business process management
- Total quality management
- Document management system
