= Management process =

Planning process

A management process is a process of setting goals, planning and/or controlling the organising and leading the execution of any type of activity, such as:

- A project (project management process), or
- A process (process management process, sometimes referred to as the process performance measurement and management system)

An organization's senior management is responsible for carrying out its management process. However, this is not always the case for all management processes, for example, sometimes it is the responsibility of the project manager to carry out a project management process.

== Steps ==
- Planning: Determines the objectives, evaluate the different alternatives and choose the best from them
- Organizing: Defines the group's functions, establish relationships and defining authority and responsibility
- Staffing: Recruitment or placement and selection or training takes place for the development of members in the firm
- Directing: Gives direction to the employees
- Controlling: Involves ensuring that performance does not deviate from standards
- Coordination: Ensures different departments and groups work in sync

== See also ==
- Business process
- Project management
- Project planning
