= Social business process management =

Business improvement discipline

Social BPM is a discipline which combines traditional business process management techniques with Web 2.0 "social" tools and technologies, to facilitate business improvement efforts.

There is debate about whether Social BPM is a methodology, a set of technologies, or just a buzzword. Forrester Research's Clay Richardson defines Social BPM to include:

- A methodology
- Social networking principles
- A combination of Web 2.0 and social tools with BPM to enable bi-directional collaboration

== See also ==
- Business process re-engineering
