= Business process orientation =

The concept of business process orientation (BPO) is based upon the work of Deming (Walton, 1996), Porter (1985), Davenport and Short (1990), Hammer (1993, 1996 and 1999), Grover et al. (1995), and Coombs and Hull (1996). This body of work suggests that firms could enhance their overall performance by adopting a “process view” of the organization. Although many firms have adopted the BPO concept, little to no empirical data existed substantiating its effectiveness in facilitating improved business performance. McCormack (2000) conducted an empirical study to explore the relationship between BPO and enhanced business performance. The research results showed that BPO is critical in reducing conflict and encouraging greater connectedness within an organization, while improving business performance. Moreover, companies with strong measures of BPO showed better overall business performance. The research also showed that high BPO levels within organizations led to a more positive corporate climate, illustrated through better organizational connectedness and less internal conflict. Another empirical study by Kohlbacher (2009) reveals that BPO is positively associated with customer satisfaction, product quality, delivery speed and time-to-market speed.

BPO champions argue that it is a new approach to management that replaces rigid hierarchies with structures that are much flatter, more cooperative, more process-oriented and customer facing. Many of us have had experience with both types of organization and we know intuitively what BPO feels like..

Most of the literature on business process orientation has been in the popular press and lacks a research or empirical focus. Although empirical evidence is lacking, several models have emerged during the last few years that have been presented as the high performance, process oriented organization needed in today and tomorrow’s world. Deming, Porter, Davenport, Short, Hammer, Byrne, Imai, Drucker, Rummler-Brache and Melan have all defined what they view as the new model of the organization. According to each model’s proponent, the “building” of this model requires a new approach and a new way of thinking about the organization which will result in dramatic business performance improvements. This “new way of thinking” or “viewing” your organization has been generally described as business process orientation.

Process centering or building an organization with a business process orientation has led to many reported successes. Texas Instruments, Progressive Insurance and American Standard Companies have all been reported, albeit anecdotally, as receiving improved business performance from building a process orientation within an organization (Hammer 1996). Business process orientation has also led to successes when applied to medium and small scale business that is properly setup.

Process orientation, and its relationship to improved cross-functional interaction, was introduced almost fifteen years ago by Michael Porter. He introduced the concept of interoperability across the value chain as a major issue within firms (Porter 1985). W. Edwards Deming also contributed with the “Deming Flow Diagram” depicting the connections across the firm from the customer to the supplier as a process that could be measured and improved like any other process (Walton 1986). Thomas Davenport and James Short (1990) described a process orientation within an organization as a key component in the “New Industrial Engineering: Information Technology and Business Process Redesign.”

Michael Hammer also presented the business process orientation concept as an essential ingredient of a successful “reengineering” effort. Hammer coined this term to describe the development of a customer focused, strategic business process based organization enabled by rethinking the assumptions in a process oriented way and utilizing information technology as a key enabler (Hammer, 1993). Hammer offers reengineering as a strategy to overcome the problematic cross-functional activities that are presenting major performance issues to firms and cites many examples of successes and failures in his series of books and articles. Hallmark and Wal-Mart are often put forward as success stories and IBM and GM as the failures.

Culture is a major theme in the examples cited. A “business process culture” is a culture that is cross-functional, customer oriented along with process and system thinking. This can be expanded by Davenport’s definition of process orientation as consisting of elements of structure, focus, measurement, ownership and customers (Davenport 1993). Davenport also stressed commitment to process improvement that directly benefits the customer and business process information oriented systems as a major component of this culture

Finally, Hammer (Hammer 1993, 1995, 1996, 1999) described “process thinking” as cross-functional and outcome oriented. He also used four categories to describe the components of an organization. These are:

1. Business Processes
2. Jobs and Structures
3. Management and Measurement Systems
4. Values and Beliefs

== The Definition of BPO ==
The BPO concept has been examined in academic research and implemented by a number of organizations. Research findings and practical applications have contributed to the development of frameworks and models associated with the concept.

Our approach to building this foundation began with an extensive literature review, interviews with experts both in the U.S. and Europe and testing with experienced practitioners and experts to determine the key definition and variables within BPO. Using various statistical techniques (domain sampling, coefficient alpha testing, and factor analysis), we both determined the validity of various BPO variables and condensed those variables into a simpler composite list (survey instrument) that offered easy use in measuring BPO within an organization (McCormack 1999).

It is important to consider originality or value as well. An observation of studies conducted into process management revealed the use proxy variables as an important indicator for PO. A good example is the ISO 9000 certification.

Our research found that the practitioners and experts said a Business Process Oriented Organization comes down to this:

"An organization that emphasizes process as opposed to hierarchies, a process oriented way of thinking, outcomes and customers."

We also found that BPO also breaks into three elements:

- Process Management and Measurement – measures that include aspects of the process like output quality, cycle time, process cost and variability compared to the traditional accounting measures.
- Process Jobs – "product development process owner" rather than "research manager".
- Process View – thorough documentation from top to bottom and beginning to end of a process.

Recent research extends the elements of McCormack (1999) and concludes that the concept of BPO consists of the following components:

- Design and documentation of business processes
- Management commitment towards process orientation
- Process ownership (see process owner)
- Process performance measurement
- Corporate culture in line with the process approach
- Application of continuous process improvement methodologies (see continuous improvement process or business process improvement), and
- Process-oriented organizational structure.
