= Unified interoperability =

Unified interoperability is the property of a system that allows for the integration of real-time and non-real time communications, activities, data, and information services (i.e., unified) and the display and coordination of those services across systems and devices (i.e., interoperability). Unified interoperability provides the capability to communicate and exchange processing across different applications, data, and infrastructure.

== Unified communications ==
Unified communications has been led by the business world, which has a need for efficiency, simplicity, and speed. Rather than a single tool or product, unified communications is a set of products that deliver a nearly identically user experience across multiple devices or media types. The system begins with “presence information” - a feature of telecommunications technology that “senses” where a user is in relation to the technology. This change has been dominated by telecommunications providers integrating video, instant messaging, voice, and collaboration.

== Unified Communications Interoperability Forum ==
In May 2010, a number of communications technology vendors founded a nonprofit organization for the advancement of interoperability. The goal of the Unified Communications Interoperability Forum is to enable complete interoperability of hardware and software across huge networks of systems. The UCIF relies on existing standards rather than the authoring of new ones. Members of the UCIF include (*founding member):

- HP*
- Microsoft*
- Polycom*
- Logitech*
- Juniper Networks*
- Acme Packet
- Huawei
- Aspect Software
- AudioCodes
- Broadcom
- BroadSoft
- Brocade Communications Systems
- ClearOne
- Jabra
- Plantronics
- Siemens Enterprise Communications
- Teliris

== Interoperability ==
In the broadest sense, interoperability is the ability of multiple systems (usually computer systems) to work together seamlessly. In the Information Age, interoperability is a highly desirable trait for most business systems. Likewise, as homes become more infused with networked technologies (desktop PCs, tablet computers, smartphones, Internet-ready television), interoperability becomes an issue even for the average consumer.

Computer operating systems are a prime example of interoperability, wherein several programs from different vendors are able to co-exist and, in many cases, exchange data in a meaningful way. An operating system is also “unified” in the sense that it presents the user with a common, easy to understand computer interface for executing numerous tasks. The unified interoperability of computers means that users need not have specialized knowledge about how computers function.

A system with the property of interoperability will retain that property well into the future. The system will be adaptable to the rapid changes in technology with only minor adjustments.

== Syntactic interoperability ==
The most fundamental level of interoperability is syntactic interoperability. At this level, systems can exchange data without loss or corruption. Certain data formats are especially suited to the exchange of data between diverse systems. XML (extensible markup language), for instance, allows data to be transmitted in a comprehensible format for people and machines. SQL (structured query language), on the other hand, is an industry-standard, nearly universal format for compiling information in a database. SQL databases are essential for a business such as Amazon.com, with its vast catalog of products, attributes, and consumer reviews.

== Semantic interoperability ==
Semantic interoperability goes a step further than syntactic interoperability. Systems with semantic interoperability can not only exchange data effortlessly, but also interpret and communicate that data to human users in a meaningful, actionable way.

== Distributed functions and processing interoperability ==
Distributed functions and processing interoperability focus on the ability to create new products, applications and operating models without traditional intermediaries like data models, databases or large system integrations through establishing a Unified Interoperability framework between normally, diverse and distributed sources, data, technology and other assets.

It enables business problems to be solved by connecting interoperable components of any characteristic into single, uniform, global “instruction chain” of functionality. Components use existing IP or applications and so integrate disparate technology to a uniform platform. Configuration models combine runtime processing infrastructure for common and predictable performance, security, resiliency, and availability with the whole process, enabling the uniform exchange of data and consistent processing across components, irrespective of technology, format or location.

== Benefits ==
Unified interoperability offers benefits for every stakeholder in a system. For customers and end-users of a system, unified interoperability offers a more convenient, satisfying experience. In business, interoperability helps lower costs and improves overall efficiency. As businesses strive to maximize the efficiency of their integrated systems, they encourage innovation and problem solving.
