= Manufacturing process management =

Collection of technologies and methods

Manufacturing process management (MPM) is a collection of technologies and methods used to define how products are to be manufactured. MPM differs from ERP/MRP which is used to plan the ordering of materials and other resources, set manufacturing schedules, and compile cost data.

A cornerstone of MPM is the central repository for the integration of all these tools and activities aids in the exploration of alternative production line scenarios; making assembly lines more efficient with the aim of reduced lead time to product launch, shorter product times and reduced work in progress (WIP) inventories as well as allowing rapid response to product or product changes.

- Production process planning
  - Manufacturing concept planning
  - Factory layout planning and analysis
    - work flow simulation.
    - walk-path assembly planning
    - plant design optimization
  - Mixed model line balancing.
  - Workloads on multiple stations.
  - Process simulation tools e.g. die press lines, manufacturing lines
  - Ergonomic simulation and assessment of production assembly tasks
  - Resource planning
- Computer-aided manufacturing (CAM)
  - Numerical control CNC
  - Direct numerical control (DNC)
  - Tooling/equipment/fixtures development
  - Tooling and Robot work-cell setup and offline programming (OLP)
- Generation of shop floor work instructions
- Time and cost estimates
  - ABC – Manufacturing activity-based costing
  - Outline of industrial organization
- Quality computer-aided quality assurance (CAQ)
  - Failure mode and effects analysis (FMEA)
  - Statistical process control (SPC)
  - Computer aided inspection with coordinate-measuring machine (CMM)
  - Tolerance stack-up analysis using PMI models.
- Success measurements
  - Overall equipment effectiveness (OEE),
- Communication with other systems
  - Enterprise resource planning (ERP)
  - Manufacturing operations management (MOM)
  - Product data management (PDM)
  - SCADA (supervisory control and data acquisition) real time process monitoring and control
  - Human–machine interface (HMI) (or man-machine interface (MMI))
  - Distributed control system (DCS)

== See also ==
- List of production topics
- Process management
- Quality management system processes
- Operations Management
- Industrial Management
- Industrial technology
- Industrial Engineering
