= Process-based management =

Organizational style

Process-based management is a management approach that views a business as a collection of processes, managed to achieve a desired result. Processes are managed and improved by the organisation for the purpose of achieving its vision, mission and core values. A clear correlation between processes and vision supports the company in planning strategies, structuring business and using sufficient resources to achieve long-term success.

From a process perspective, an organisation regards its business as a system of vision-achieving vertical processes rather than specific activities and tasks of individual functions. The system is not a method or tool for a particular process, but a holistic approach to manage all of an organisation's processes. To manage processes effectively the organisation must have an effective team network and full knowledge of their vision.

The general management system focuses on specific work-knowledge and direct solutions for cost and budget; on the other hand, process based management applies these financial measurements but in an operational way considering how each performance affects the company as an amalgam of different processes. As a result of recent advances in technology and increased international competition, more companies aim for better methods of grouping and integrating organisational activities.

== Vision, mission and values ==
Vision, mission and core values are three crucial factors to manage an organisation from a process perspective. Considering the vision, mission and values as a direction of their business, an organisation can build their corporate strategy and determine the processes they will take into account. As a result, the organisation obtains strengths and competitiveness among other companies.

First, the vision is an aspirational purpose what the organisation would like to achieve in the long run. The vision leads the company to challenge various tasks and develop its own business strategy. In other words, the organisation considers vision as a motivation to build a business structure, determine strategic plans and manage human resources. Therefore, the company carries out vision-achieving operations as their primary goals.

Mission is a fundamental purpose of a company that remains unchanged over time. The mission provides a guidance for decision making and gives a path to successful results. For instance, mission is different from a vision in that mission is a something to be achieved whereas a vision is something to be aimed for achievement.

Core values are principles that help companies to determine whether their actions and decisions are right or wrong. Values are essential to making decisions and sustaining the company's long-term success.

== Advantages ==
- Documenting a process provides a clear guideline of how organisation improves their processes and performances over time.
- Process based management measures the full set of activities in one business. For instance, it focuses on internal processes such as customer satisfaction, quality of product and security as well as financial results including revenues, profits, costs, and budget.
- Understanding of the correlations between business processes avoids taking wrong decisions. It reduces costs, time and resources wasting on unnecessary things.
- Analysing the processes, an organisation will be able to predict sources of hazard and choose right decisions.
- The system protects intellectual capital of the organisation. Monitoring the development of processes, the organisation can analyse risks and its weakness.
- Focusing on continuous improvement and customer’s requirements, the organisation improves customer services which deliver value to its customers.
- Evaluating the process assures the results a company expecting to obtain.
- Process based management is an integration of both input and output in business process. It controls personnel, technical and financial resources in a holistic viewpoint.
- The organisation can improve IT system that reduces unnecessary complexity and improves the quality of performance measurement.
- Analysing processes and implementing new objects if required, the organisation deal with fast changes in demand.

== Stages ==
=== Documenting the process ===
To manage its business from a process based perspective, an organisation requires to understand what defines the process and which activities they consist of.

A business consists of different departments in charge of specific jobs or functions. Therefore, the processes support these managerial sectors and transform successful outputs. Then a process team performs a set of sequential tasks to analyse whether the organisation delivers useful outputs to the customers.

Basically, processes are built by information that indicates the current state of company and research data such as customer satisfaction. The information includes customer-based agreement, management documentation, purchasing manuals and flow charts. For instance, the flow chart is a useful information in order to control the flow of processes and list several steps and activities in detail.

=== Analysing process performance ===
Analysed and clarified processes are allowed to implement on the actual business. Then, an organisation monitors its business and improves the overall stage of process.

To evaluate the sequence of process, measurement is an essential element that shows results of process performance with numerical and comparative data. In other words, organisations obtain a relevant analysis using the measurements that can be shown as graphical representations such as pie charts, bar charts, cause-and-effect analysis, and gap analysis.

Many organisations highly depend on data and visual analysis processed by information system. For this reason, organisation must obtain accurate analysis based on exact data and must be cautious for mistaken output that impacts whole process of their business.

As a result, the measurements help the company to analyse current state of performance and give guidance for the firm’s sustainable improvements.

=== Implementing improvements ===
Having designed the processes of management system and analysed the performances using useful measurements, the final step is how to improve the system and maintain its effectiveness. Therefore, implementing the improvements is a key activity to examine the processes and improve the flow of the management system.

An organisation determines which part of processes must be improved and modified. It analyses how each process influences a set of activities and applies the improvements to some parts of system. The purpose of implementation is to operate its business strategically and to deliver sufficient resources. In effect, the process based management results in outputs that satisfy their customers and develop the business itself.

== See also ==
- Project management
- Strategic planning
- Business process modeling
- Value-based management
