= Ford GT (disambiguation) =

Ford GT is a mid-engine two-seater sports car produced for the 2005 to 2006 model years, and the 2017 to 2022 model years.

It may also refer to:

- Ford GT40, a 1960s racing car
- Ford GT70, a limited production rally sports car made by Ford of Britain in 1970 and a 1971 concept car by Ghia
- Ford GT90, a 1995 concept car
- Galpin GTR1, a 2013 limited production sports car
- Ford GTX1, a roadster model of the Ford GT

Unrelated to the cars above:

- Ford GTB, a tactical truck
- Ford Mustang GT, a V8-powered muscle car
- Ford Falcon GT, an Australian muscle car
- Ford Performance Vehicles GT, an Australian muscle car

== See also ==
- Super GT, a grand touring car race series in Japan
