= Superplastic forming and diffusion bonding =

Superplastic forming and diffusion bonding (SPF/DB) is a technique allowing the manufacture of complex-shaped hollow metallic parts. It combines Superplastic forming (SPF) with a second element "Diffusion Bonding" to create the completed structures.

== Principle ==
Two metal sheets are welded together at their edges, then heated within the confines of a female mould tool.

When the part is hot, an inert gas is injected between the two sheets; the part becomes hollow to the form of the mould. Parts may be welded in other areas than the edges to give an internal structure as the sheets are blown.

== Applications ==
- Hollow titanium blades for jet engines.
- Military aircraft structures such the aft fuselage of the McDonnell Douglas F-15E Strike Eagle. McDonnell Douglas (McDonnell Aircraft Company) developed the production equipment and tooling technology in St. Louis during the mid-1980s through the leadership of engineers Ray Kittelson, Vern Mueller, David Rohe and Duane Jennings.

== See also ==
- Superplasticity
