= Ford GT =

Flagship sports car by Ford (2005–2006 & 2017–2022)

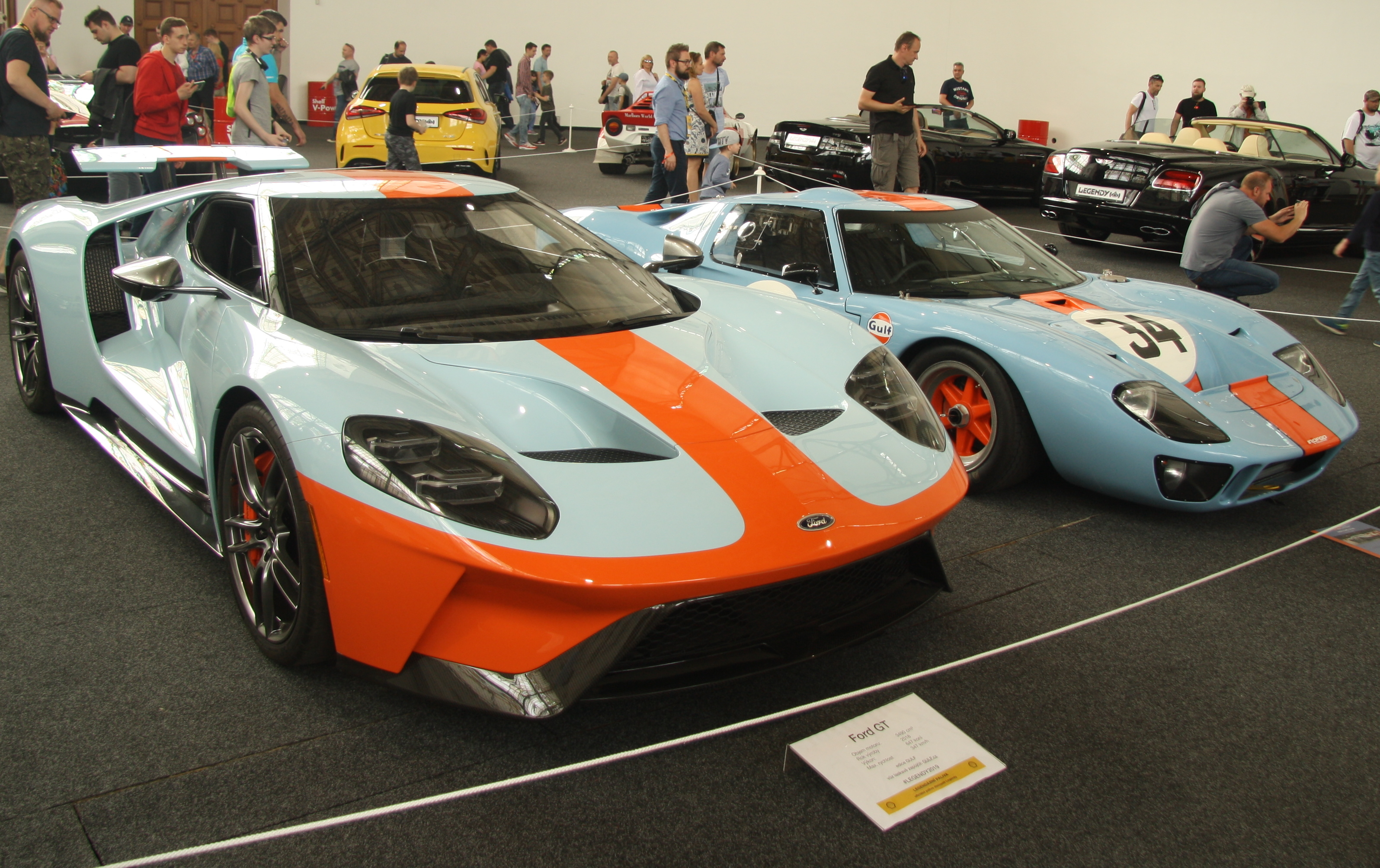
- 2018 Ford GT with a 1968 Ford GT40

Overview
- Manufacturer: Ford Motor Company
- Production: 2004–2006; 2016–2022
- Model years: 2005–2006; 2017–2022

Body and chassis
- Class: Sports car (S)
- Body style: 2-door coupé
- Layout: Rear mid-engine, rear-wheel-drive

Chronology
- Predecessor: Ford GT40

The Ford GT is a mid-engine two-seater sports car manufactured and marketed by American automobile manufacturer Ford for the 2005 model year in conjunction with the company's 2003 centenary. The second generation Ford GT became available for the 2017 model year.

The GT recalls Ford's historically significant GT40, a consecutive four-time winner of the 24 Hours of Le Mans (1966–1969), including a 1-2-3 finish in 1966.

== First generation (2005–2006) ==
First generation
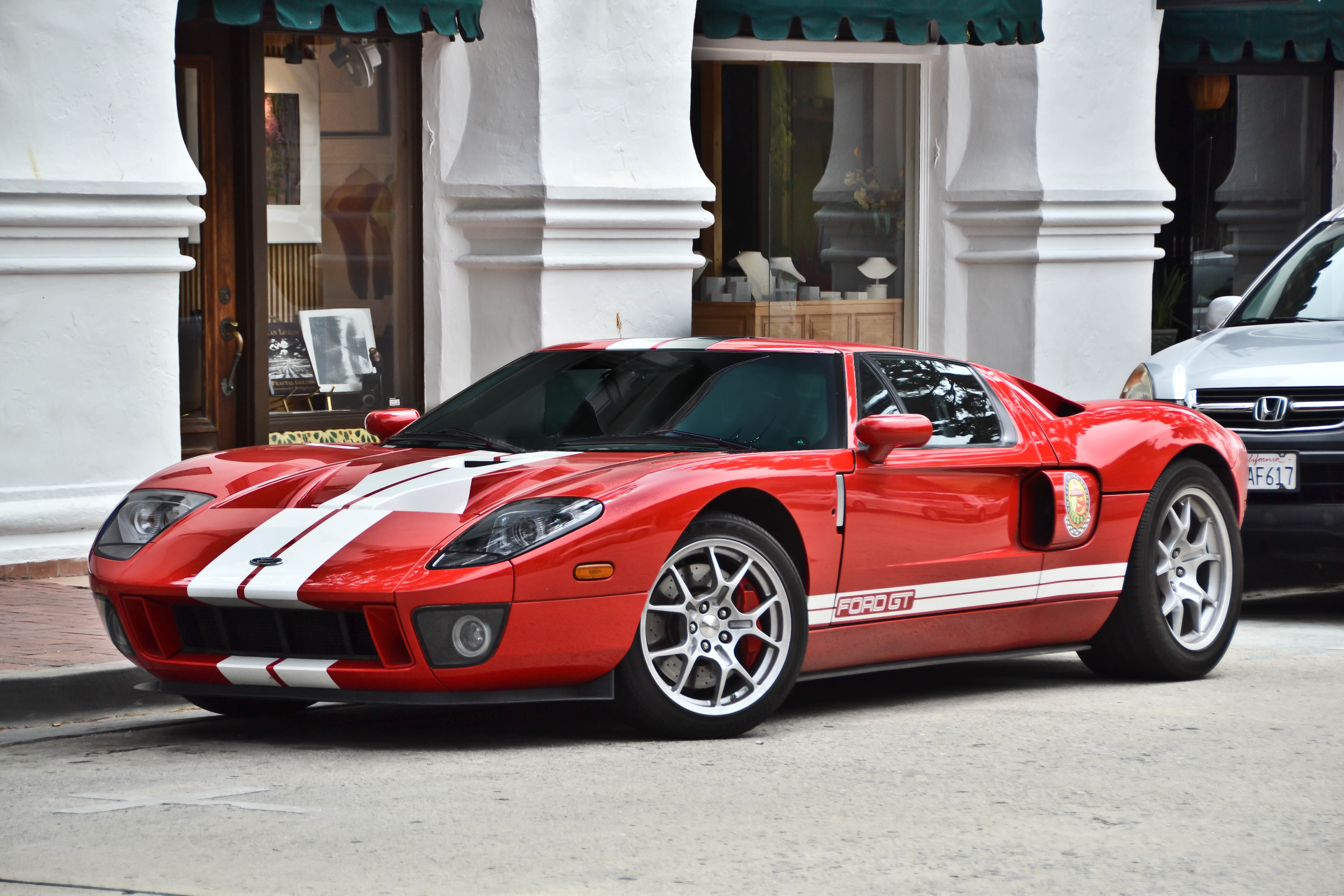

Overview
- Production: June 2004 – September 2006; 4,038 produced
- Model years: 2005–2006
- Assembly: United States: Wixom, Michigan (Wixom Assembly Plant; interior); Troy, Michigan (SSV Inc.; Body Paint facility); Norwalk, Ohio (Mayflower Vehicle Systems; Production and assembly); Romeo, Michigan (Ford Romeo Engine Plant; Engine and transmission)
- Designer: Camilo Pardo under J Mays

Body and chassis
- Body style: 2-door coupé; 2-door targa top roadster (GTX1)
- Related: Galpin Ford GTR1

Powertrain
- Engine: 5.4 L (329.5 cu in) supercharged Ford Modular V8
- Transmission: 6-speed Ricardo M7003GT manual

Dimensions
- Wheelbase: 106.7 in (2,710 mm)
- Length: 182.8 in (4,640 mm)
- Width: 76.9 in (1,950 mm)
- Height: 44.3 in (1,125 mm)
- Curb weight: 3,485 lb (1,581 kg)

=== Development ===
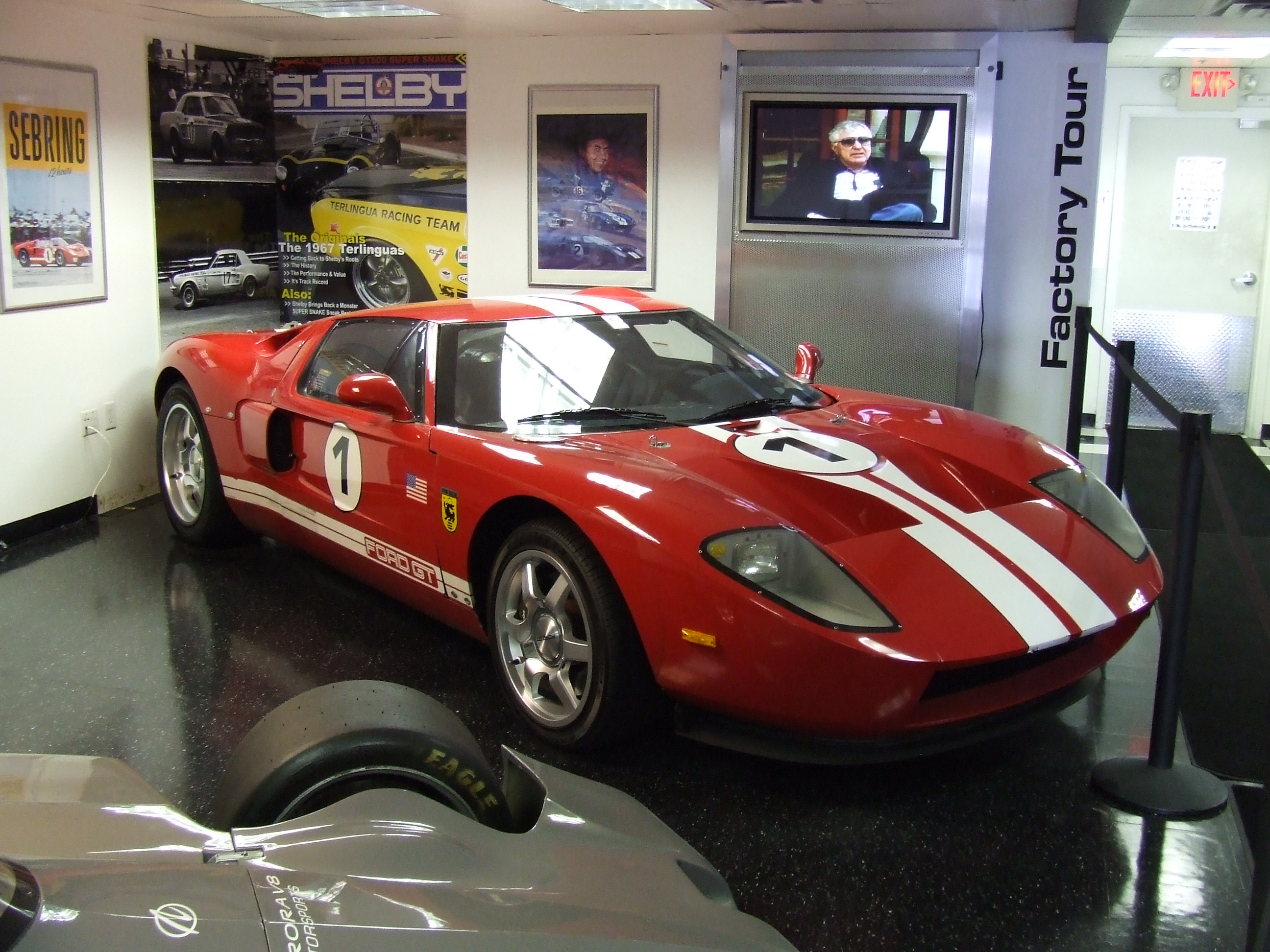
The first Ford GT prototype, "Workhorse 1" at the Shelby American Museum, Las Vegas, Nevada

The Ford GT began life as a concept car designed in anticipation of the automaker's centennial year and as part of its drive to showcase and revive its "heritage" names such as Mustang and Thunderbird. At the 2002 North American International Auto Show, Ford unveiled a new GT40 Concept car. Camilo Pardo, the then head of Ford's "Living Legends" studio, is credited as the chief designer of the GT and worked under the guidance of J Mays. Carroll Shelby, the original designer of the Shelby GT 500, was brought in by Ford to help develop the GT; which included performance testing of the prototype car. While under development, the project was called Petunia.

The GT is similar in outward appearance to the original GT40, but is bigger, wider, and most importantly 4 in (100 mm) taller than the original's 40 in (100 cm) overall height; as a result, a potential name for the car was the GT44. Although the cars are visually related, structurally, there is no similarity between the modern GT and the 1960s GT40 that inspired it. After six weeks from the unveiling of the GT40 concept, Ford announced a limited production run of the car. Three pre-production cars were shown to the public in 2003 as part of Ford's centenary celebrations, and delivery of the production version called simply the Ford GT began in the fall of 2004.

As the Ford GT was built as part of the company's 100th anniversary celebration, the left headlight cluster was designed to read "100".

=== Naming difficulties ===
A British company, Safir Engineering, who built continuation GT40 cars in the 1980s, owned the "GT40" trademark at that time. When production of the continuation cars ended, they sold the excess parts, tooling, design, and trademark to a small Ohio based company called Safir GT40 Spares. This company licensed the use of the "GT40" trademark to Ford for the initial 2002 show car. When Ford decided to put the GT40 concept to production stage, negotiations between the two firms failed as Ford did not pay the US$40 million the owners of the name demanded. Thus, the production cars are simply called the GT.

=== Production ===
The GT was produced for the 2005 and 2006 model years. The car began assembly at Mayflower Vehicle Systems (MVS) in Norwalk, Ohio and was painted and continued assembly at Saleen Special Vehicles (SSV) facility in Troy, Michigan, through contract by Ford. The GT is powered by an engine built at Ford's Romeo Engine Plant in Romeo, Michigan. Installation of the engine and transmission along with seats and interior finishing was handled in the SVT building at Ford's Wixom, Michigan plant.

Of the 4,500 cars originally planned, approximately 100 were to be exported to Europe, starting in late 2005. An additional 200 cars were destined for sale in Canada. Production ended in September 2006 without reaching the planned production target. Approximately 550 cars were built in 2004, nearly 1,900 in 2005, and just over 1,600 in 2006, for a total of 4,038 cars. The final 11 car bodies manufactured by Mayflower Vehicle Systems were disassembled, and the frames and body panels were sold as service parts. The Wixom Assembly Plant has stopped production of all models as of May 31, 2007. Sales of the GT continued into 2007, from cars held in storage and in dealer inventories.

==== Heritage edition ====
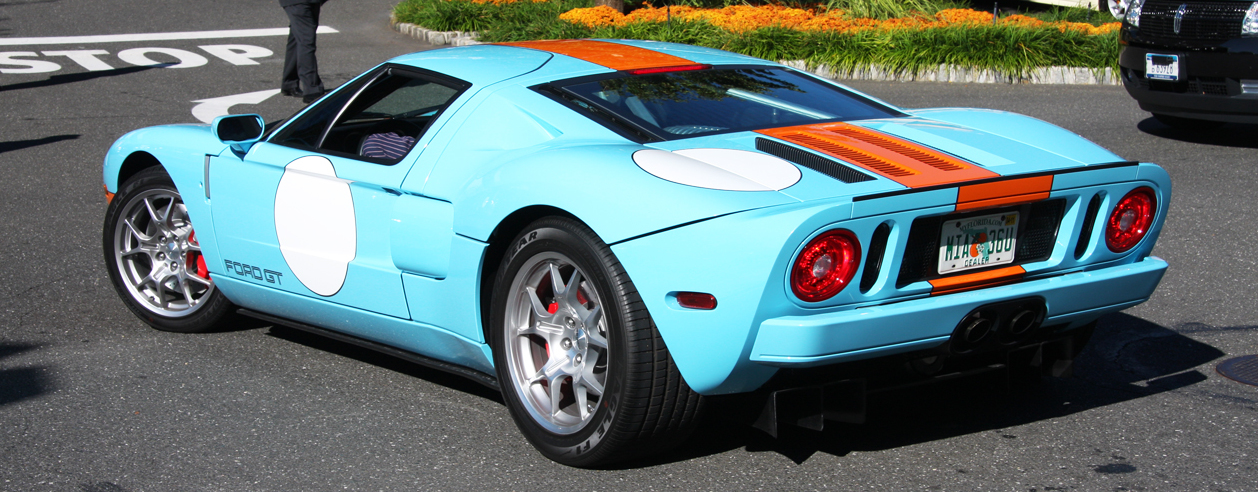
Ford GT Heritage edition

Ford produced a total of 346 Heritage editions, recognizable by the Gulf Oil-inspired livery. The livery is in honor of the back to back wins of Ford at the 1968 and 1969 24 Hours of Le Mans by the GT40 Mk I.

Ford GT, US sales and world production totals, 2004–2006
Year	Reported US Sales													Production
Year	Jan	Feb	Mar	Apr	May	Jun	Jul	Aug	Sep	Oct	Nov	Dec	Total	Production
2005	7	4	44	70	117	150	91	113	176	165	157	208	1,302	2,027
2006	157	194	204	157	178	185	147	143	133	102	261	58	1,919	2,011
Grand Total													3,221	4,038

=== Sales and marketing ===
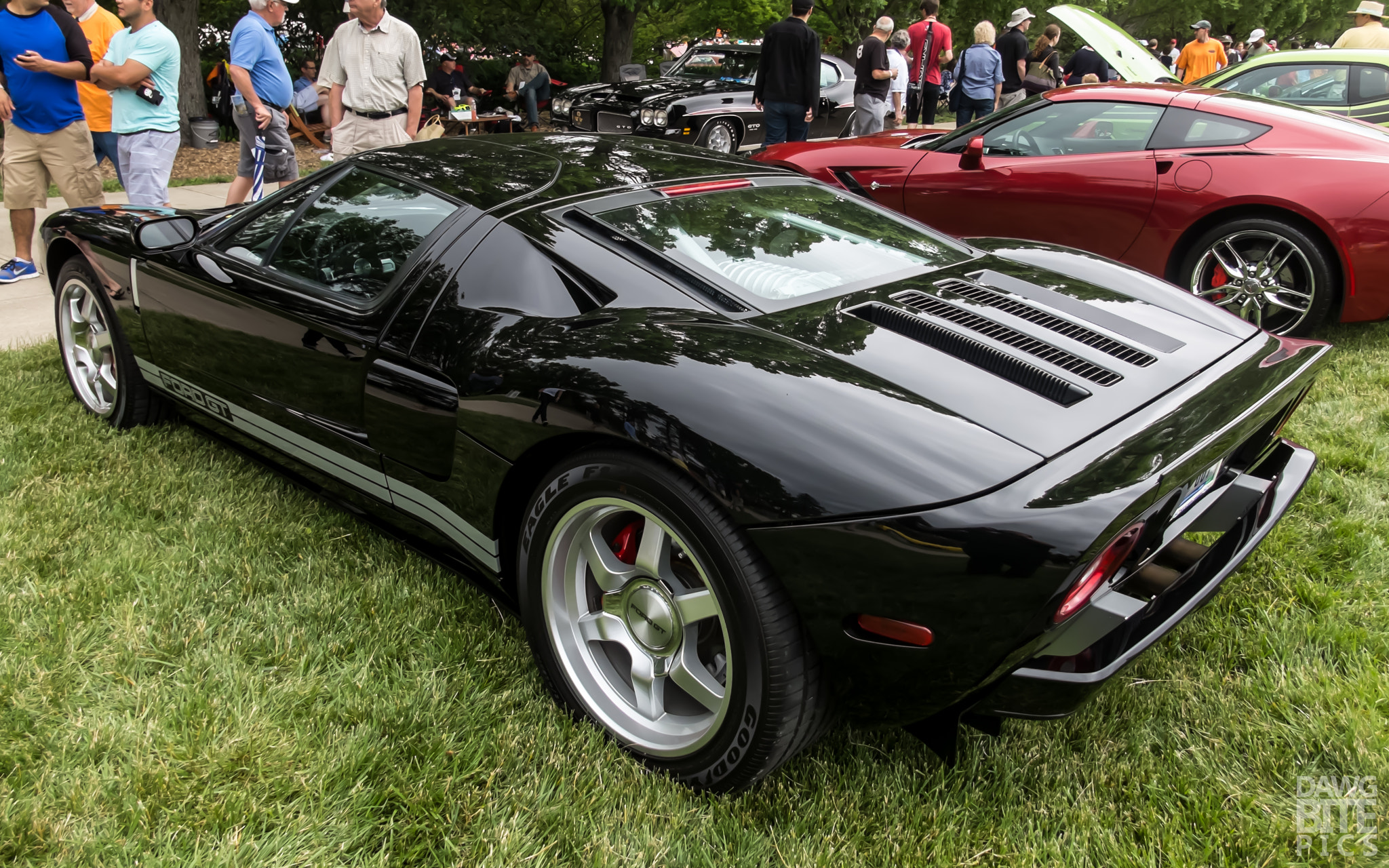
Ford GT (rear view)

When the Ford GT was first announced, the demand outpaced supply, and the cars initially sold for premium prices. The first private sale of Ford's new mid-engine sports car was completed on August 4, 2004, when former Microsoft executive Jon Shirley took delivery of his Midnight Blue 2005 Ford GT. Shirley earned the right to purchase the first production Ford GT (chassis #10) at a charity auction at the Pebble Beach Concours d'Elegance Auction after bidding over US$557,000.

A few other early cars sold for as much as a US$100,000 premium over the suggested retail price of US$139,995. Optional equipment available included a McIntosh sound system, racing stripes, painted brake calipers, and BBS forged alloy wheels adding US$13,500 to the MSRP.

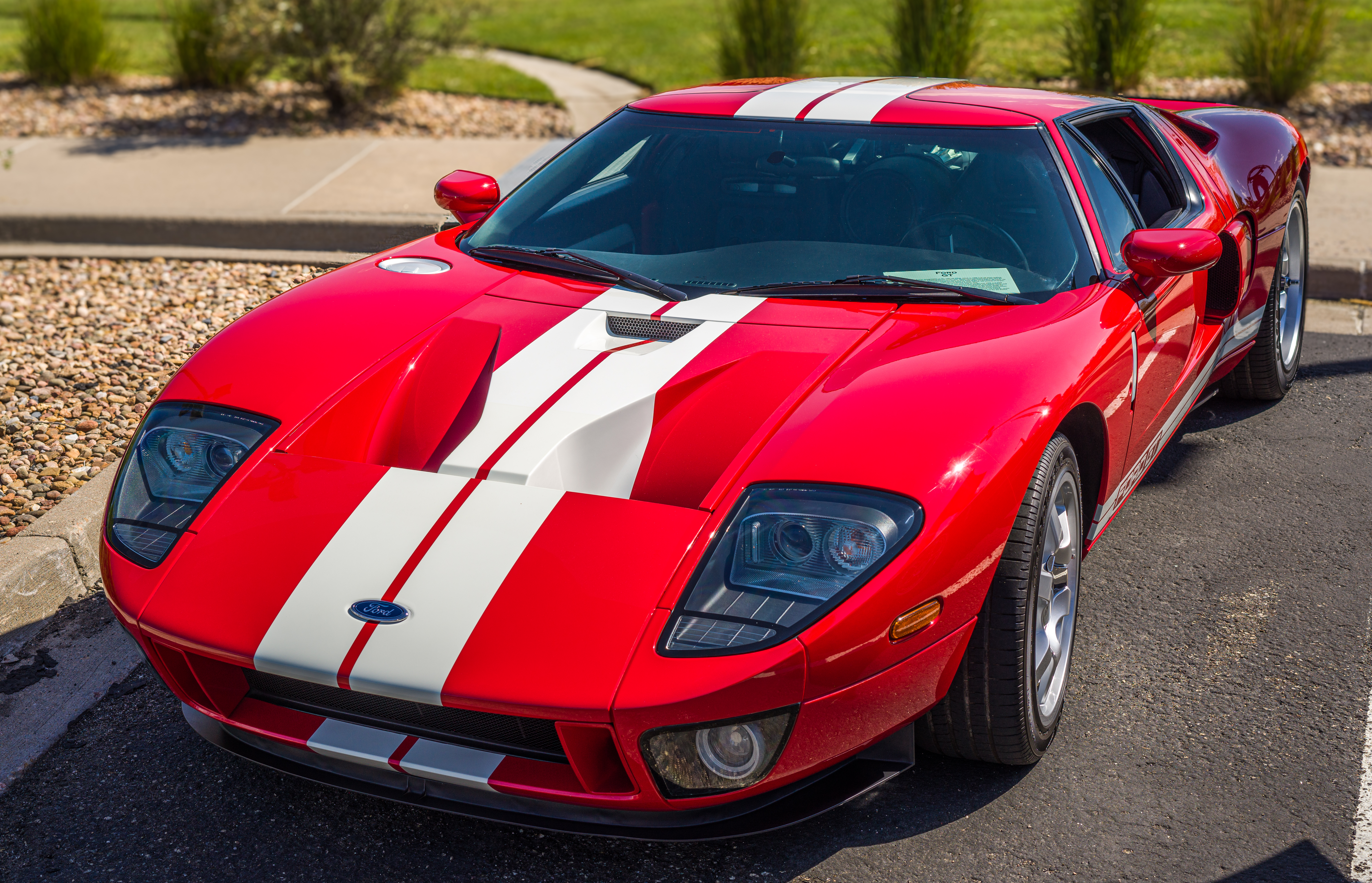
Ford GT (front view)

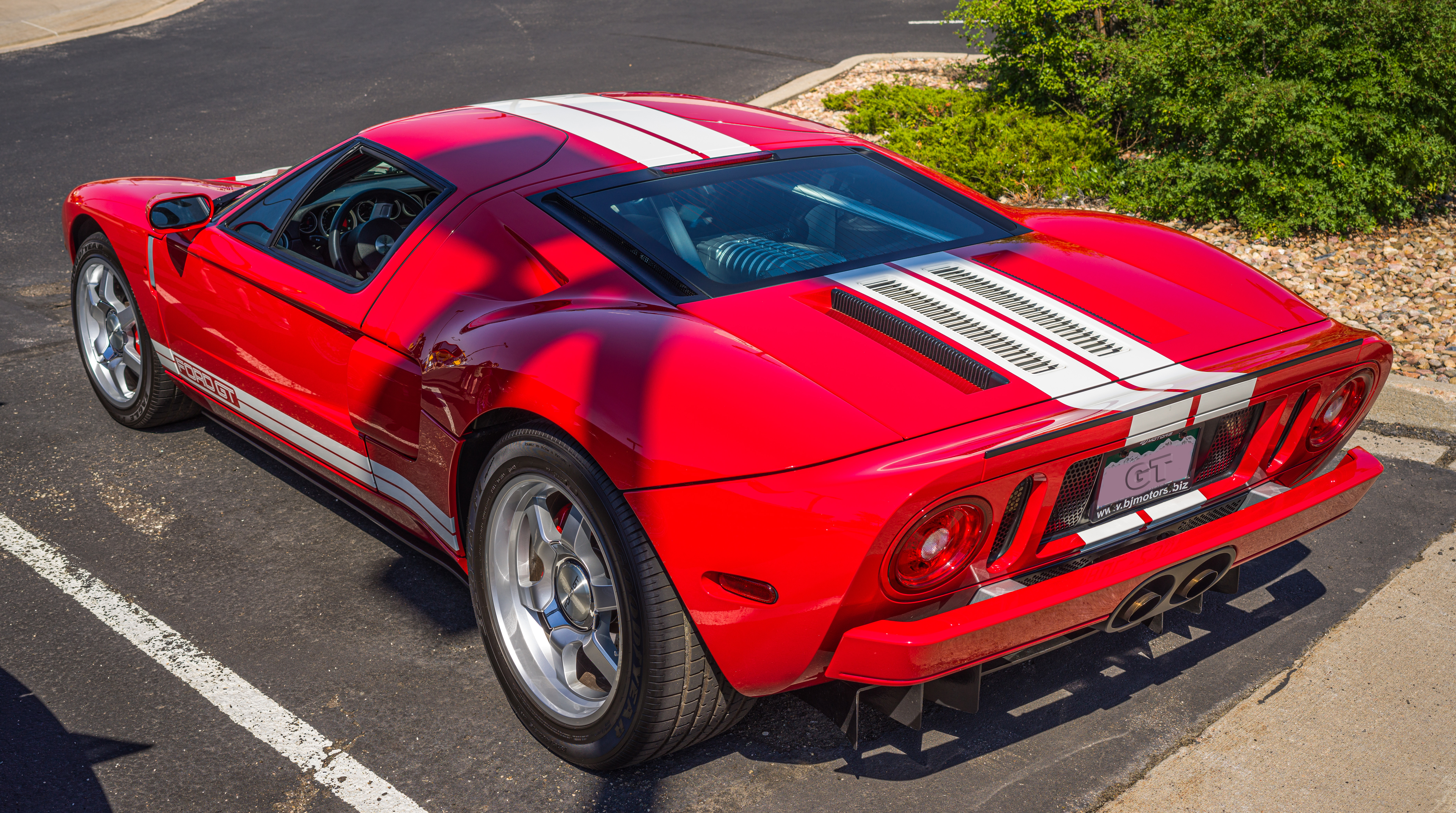
Ford GT (rear view)

=== Performance and engineering ===
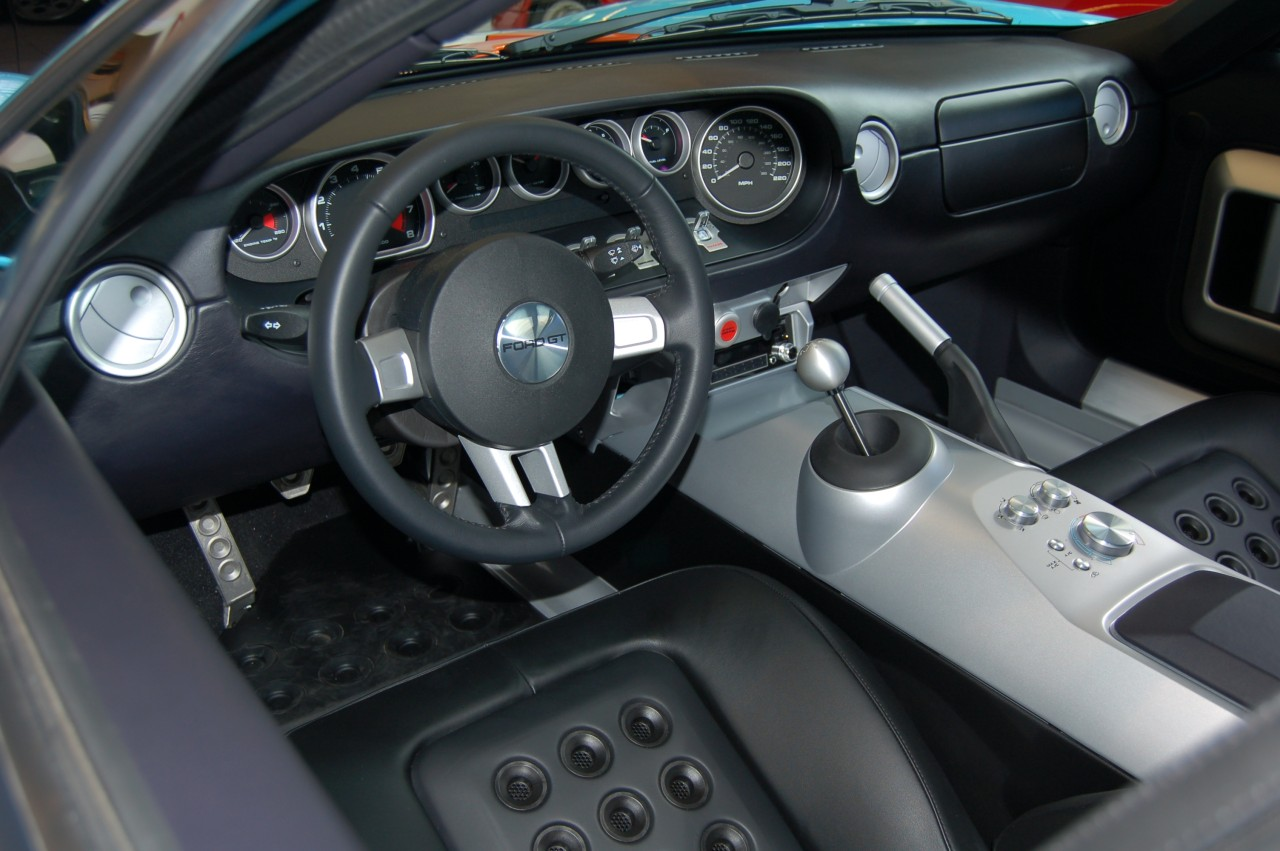
The center tunnel of the Ford GT is made from two aluminum extrusions friction stir welded to a bent aluminum sheet and houses the fuel tank

The Ford GT features many technologies unique at its time including a superplastic-formed frame, aluminum body panels, roll-bonded floor panels, a friction stir welded center tunnel, covered by a magnesium center console, a "ship-in-a-bottle" gas tank, a capless fuel filler system, one-piece panels, and an aluminum engine cover with a one-piece carbon fiber inner panel.

Brakes are four-piston aluminum Brembo calipers with cross-drilled and vented rotors at all four corners. When the rear canopy is opened, the rear suspension components and engine are visible.

The 5.4 L longitudinal rear mounted Modular V8 engine is an all-aluminum alloy engine with an Eaton 2300 Lysholm screw-type supercharger. It features a forged rotating assembly housed in an aluminum block designed specifically for the car. A dry sump oiling system is employed, allowing the engine to sit low in the car's frame. The DOHC 4 valves per cylinder heads are a revision of the 2000 Ford Mustang SVT Cobra R cylinder heads (with slightly increased wall casting thickness in the exhaust port). The camshafts have unique specifications, with more lift and duration than those found in the Shelby GT500. Power output is 550 hp (410 kW; 558 PS) at 6,500 rpm and 500 lb⋅ft (678 N⋅m) of torque at 4,500 rpm. A Ricardo 6-speed manual transmission is fitted featuring a helical limited-slip differential. Car and Driver tested the GT in January 2004 and recorded a 0-60 mph (97 km/h) acceleration time of 3.3 seconds.

Performance:

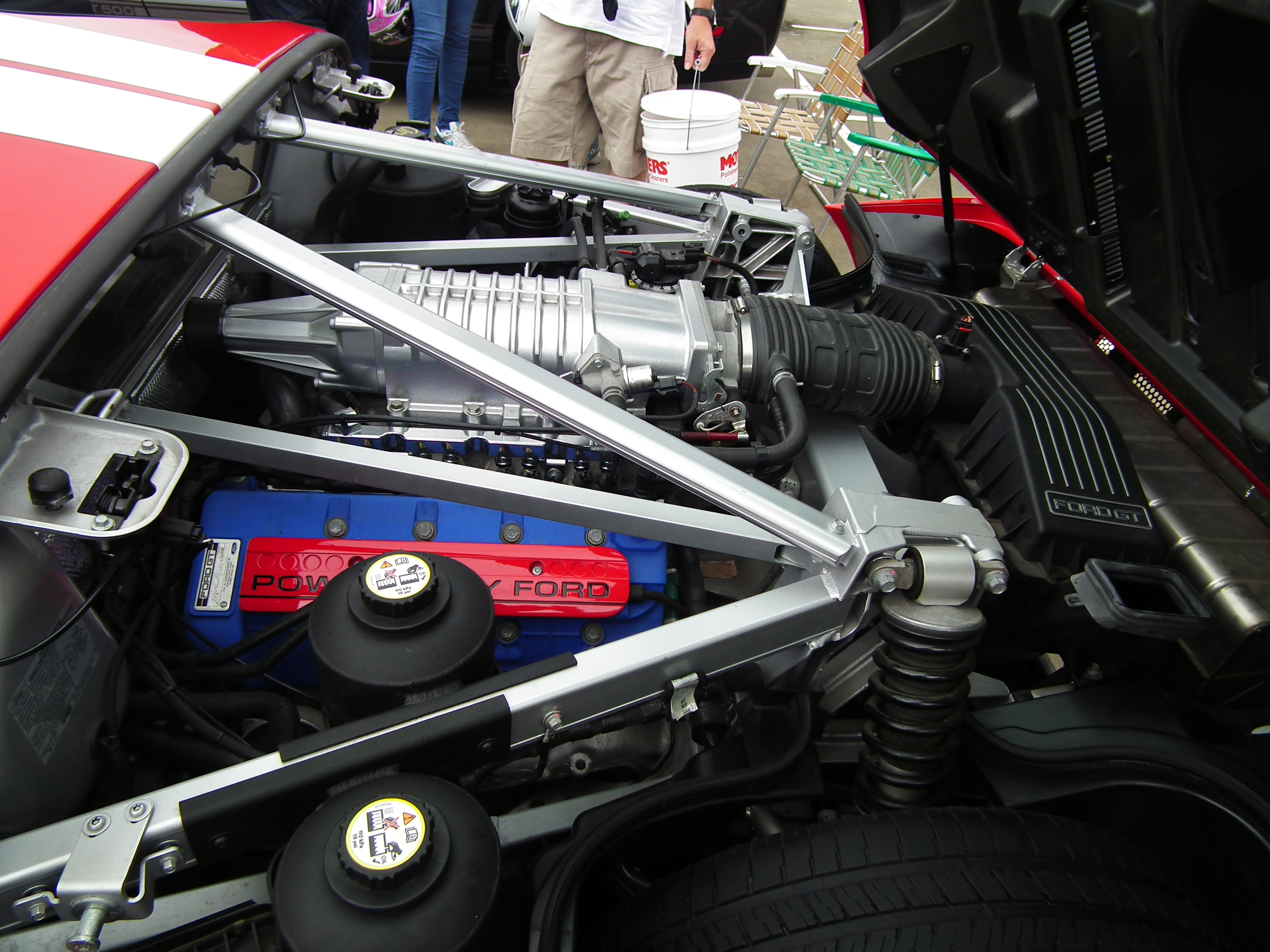
The 5.4-liter supercharged V8 engine

- Top speed: 205 mph (330 km/h)
- 1/4 mile (402 m): 11.8 seconds
- 0–62 mph (0–100 km/h): 3.8 seconds
- 0–124 mph (0–200 km/h): 12.3 seconds
- 0–186 mph (0–300 km/h): 44.3 seconds

=== Fuel consumption ===
The United States Environmental Protection Agency mileage estimate for the GT is 12 mpg_{‑US} (20 L/100 km; 14 mpg_{‑imp}) in city driving, and 19 mpg_{‑US} (12 L/100 km; 23 mpg_{‑imp}) in highway cruising, for a combined 14 mpg_{‑US} (17 L/100 km; 17 mpg_{‑imp}).

=== Standing mile speed record ===
Modified versions of the Ford GT have established several speed records, including the standing mile. One modified version broke the record for fastest street legal vehicle (the vehicle used in the record run is street legal and registered for road use in the U.S.A) achieved by a highly modified twin turbo version of the original 5.4-liter V8 rated at approximately 2,500 hp (1,864 kW) with a top speed of 310.8 mph (500.2 km/h) at Space Florida launch and landing facility.

=== Ford GTX1 ===
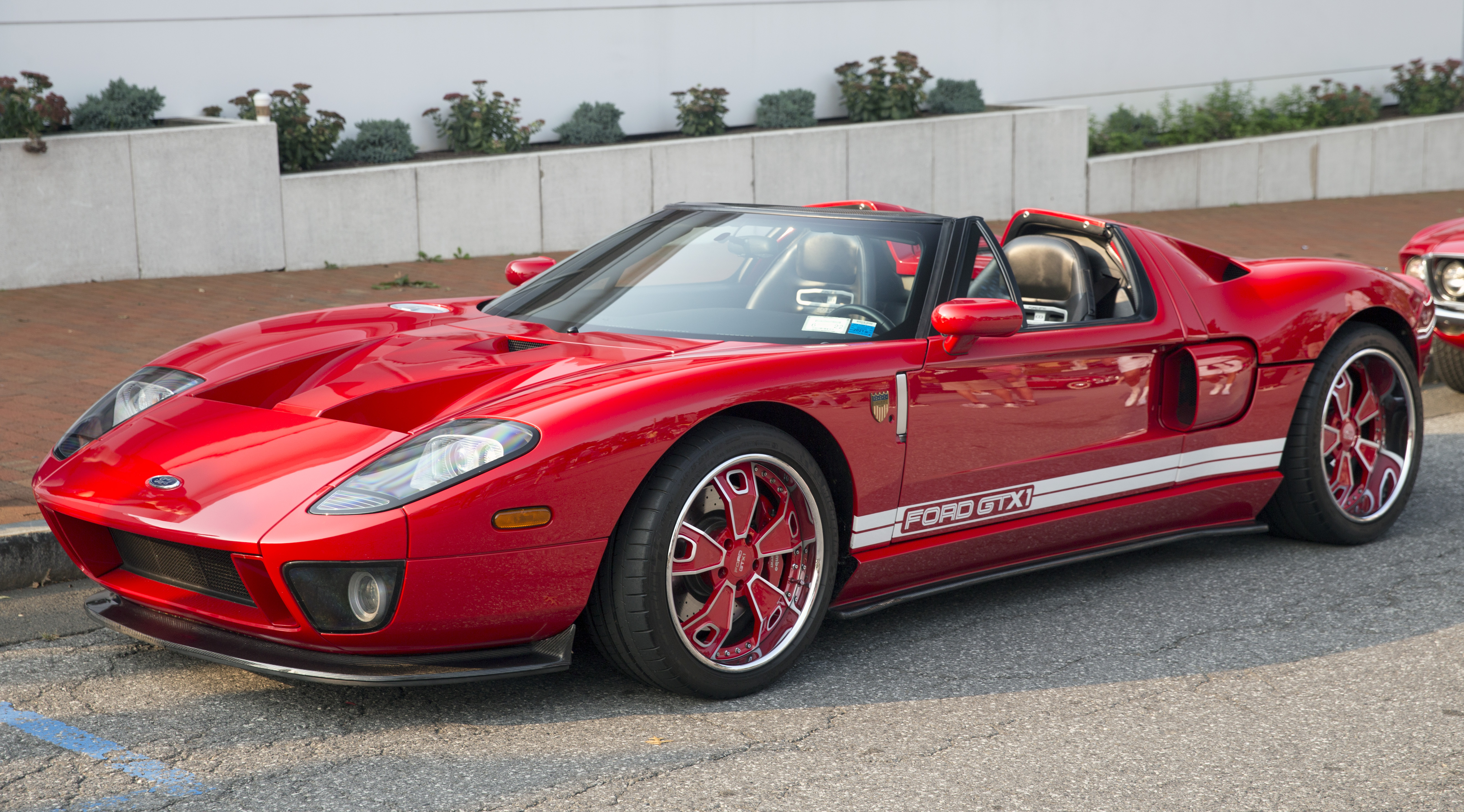
The second Ford GTX1 built

The Ford GTX1 is an aftermarket roadster iteration of the Ford GT introduced by the company at the 2005 SEMA Show. The car was built by Mark Gerisch, owner of Genaddi Design Group from Green Bay, Wisconsin with assistance from Ford. Kip Ewing, a development engineer who had been involved in the development of the GT and conceived the idea, supervised the project. The resulting chassis is ten percent less stiff than the standard GT.

The design was inspired by the open top GT40 which was conceived in the 1960s. The car had a modified engine cover, modified doors (with roof portions removed) and a central removable roof bar. Two roof pieces could be installed and removed when the roof bar was installed making the car a T-top, a canvas roof panel would be installed when the roof bar was removed. The car had headrests inspired from the Porsche Carrera GT.

The car received a positive response at the show and customers urged Ford to build this version of the GT but the end of the production of the GT in the forthcoming year meant that it would be expensive to produce another limited variant of the car. The GTX1 was offered as a kit by the body shop adding US$38,000 to the price of a standard Ford GT. The involvement of Ford in the process meant that the warranty and other obligations on the car were unaltered.

A total of 100 orders for the GTX1 were received and completed over a two-year planned production period, these including the exact copies of the SEMA show car. Other modifications on the GTX1 included race seats, a customized interior, new Wilwood brakes, a hidden rear bumper and a maximum power increase to 700 hp (522 kW; 710 PS). The GTX1 was featured in various automotive publications along with several reviews.

A specialist Sony Xplod audio system was fitted to the GTX1.

== Second generation (2017–2022) ==
Second generation
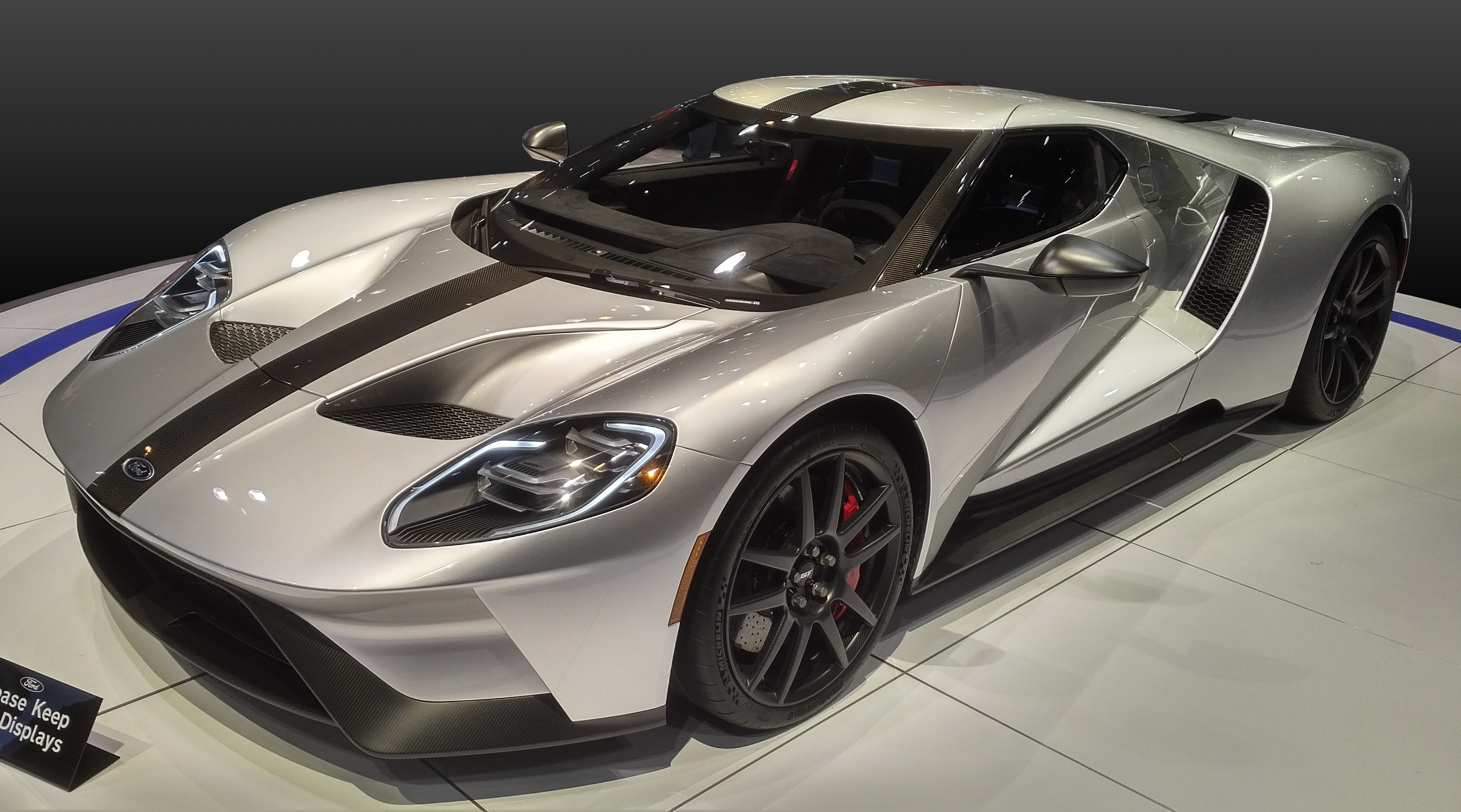
- The 2018 Ford GT on display at the 2018 Chicago Auto Show

Overview
- Production: December 2016 – December 2022 (1,350 units planned)
- Model years: 2017–2022
- Assembly: Canada: Markham, Ontario (Multimatic)
- Designer: J Mays (concept), Craig Metros (exterior), Amko Leenarts (interior)

Body and chassis
- Body style: 2-door coupé
- Doors: Butterfly

Powertrain
- Engine: 3.5 L twin-turbocharged Ford EcoBoost D35 V6
- Power output: 647–660 hp (482–492 kW) (GT); 700 hp (522 kW) (GT Mk II)
- Transmission: 7-speed Getrag 7DCL750 (PowerShift) dual-clutch

Dimensions
- Wheelbase: 2,710 mm (106.7 in)
- Length: 4,762 mm (187.5 in)
- Width: 2,004 mm (78.9 in)
- Height: 1,110 mm (43.7 in)
- Curb weight: GT: 1,521 kg (3,354 lb); GT Mk II: 3,064 lb (1,390 kg)

At the 2015 North American International Auto Show and at the unveiling of the 2015 racing video game Forza Motorsport 6, the second-generation Ford GT was shown to the public with plans for production in 2016, after a decade-old hiatus from the first generation. The car marked 50 years since the GT40 won the 1966 24 Hours of Le Mans and competed successfully in the 2016 24 Hours of Le Mans to better celebrate the anniversary, winning the LM GTE-Pro class, taking 1st and 3rd in class.

=== Development ===
The development of the second generation GT at Ford was a very secretive operation—according to the American exterior design director Craig Metros, "a handful of twelve people, including some key engineers, had access to the [design studio]". This secrecy was maintained inside Ford and to the press until its 2015 unveiling at the North American Auto Show.

The design of the new GT began with its aerodynamics package, which was closely related to the ultimate focus of the design team of creating a successful Le Mans race car. Low drag and aerodynamic efficiency were of primary importance in the development of the exterior of the car, and this drove designers to pursue a 'teardrop profile' as often seen in LMP1 cars. The powertrain of the new GT, therefore, became a secondary criterion to the external design and aerodynamic performance of the car. Although a V8 and even a V12 engine were both considered, it was ultimately decided to use Ford's EcoBoost V6 engine due to the degree of freedom that the compact engine gave designers.

The intent behind the design was for the overall look of the second generation GT to be recognizable as a part of the GT line, which meant, for example, a cut back front nose piece, circular tail lights, and raised twin exhaust pipes. There was no explicit requirement for luxury or practicality in the design of the road car, which is the reason behind the car's negligible cargo space and spartan interior. The interior seating position was fixed to provide additional space for the bodywork and teardrop exterior shape.

=== Overview ===
Like its predecessor, the new Ford GT is only offered as a 2-door coupe with the mid-rear layout, for the purpose of improved stability by keeping the center of gravity near the middle. The new GT's weight distribution is 43% front and 57% rear. Unlike the first generation car, the new GT has butterfly doors that no longer include a piece integrated into the roof.

==== Powertrain ====
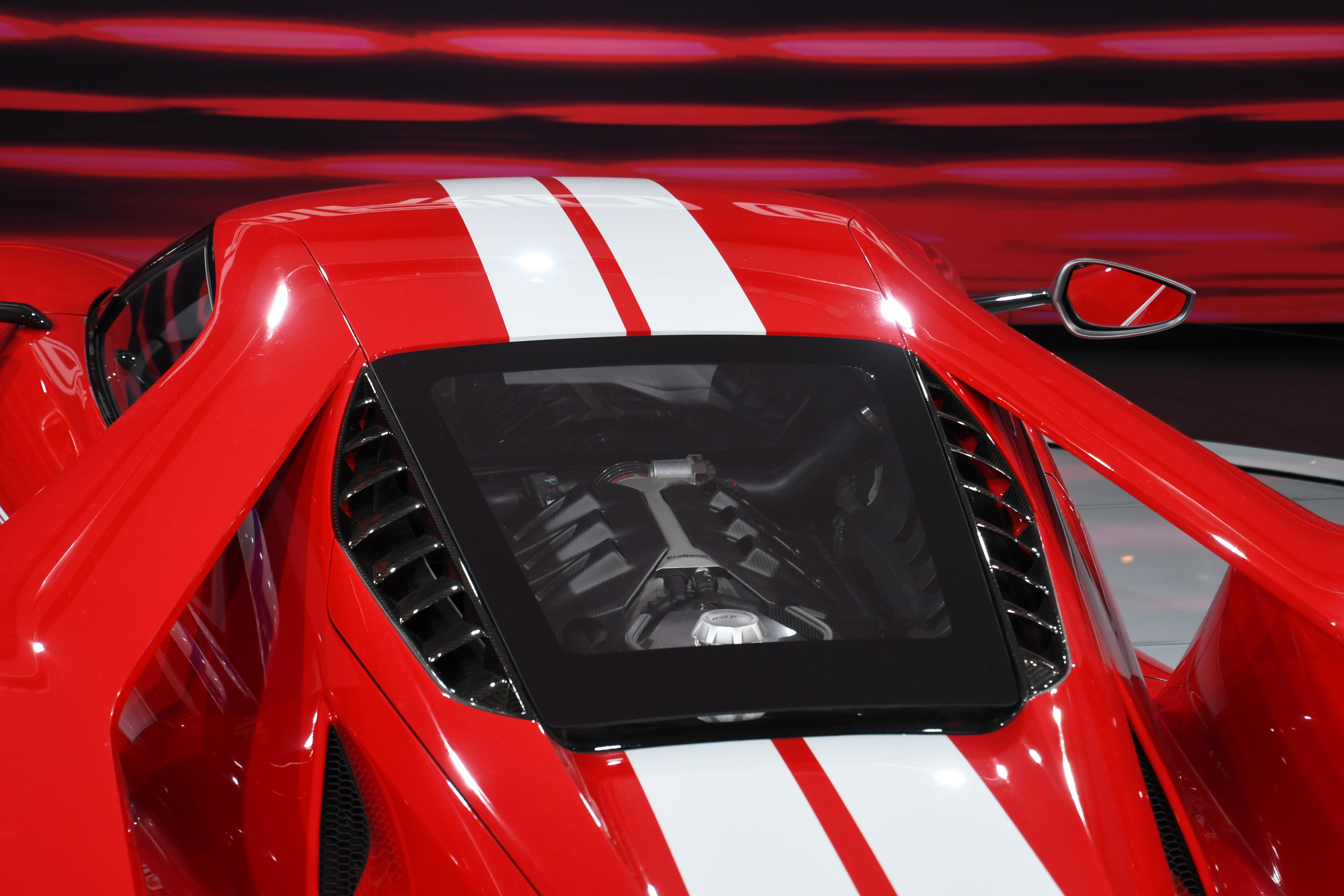
Engine compartment showing the EcoBoost V6

The car is powered by a 3,496 cc (3.5 L; 213.3 cu in) twin-turbocharged Ford EcoBoost V6 engine rated at 647 hp (482 kW; 656 PS) at 6250RPM and 550 lb⋅ft (746 N⋅m) of torque at 5900RPM. For the 2020 model year and beyond, this power output rating was increased to 660 hp (492 kW; 669 PS). The engine shares many components with the F-150's 3.5 L V6 engine including the cylinder heads, block and dual fuel system. Notable differences include larger turbochargers, an aluminum intake manifold, a dry sump lubrication system, unique camshafts and higher strength rotating and timing drive components.

The engine is paired to a Getrag 7DCL750 7-speed dual-clutch transmission.

==== Chassis for 2020 ====
Underpinning the new GT is a carbon fiber monocoque bolted to aluminum front and rear subframes covered in carbon fiber body panels. The windshield of the vehicle is made of Gorilla Glass manufactured by Corning, which is also used for manufacturing smartphone screens. The Gorilla Glass is used to reduce the weight of the vehicle by allowing for a thinner windscreen with the same strength as a normal glass windscreen. The GT employs a four-stage external dry sump oil pump and has an oil capacity of 15.3 US quarts (14.5 L).

==== Suspension ====
The new GT uses a pushrod suspension system, which move the primary components of the suspension inboard and provide space for the large aerodynamic elements in the bodywork of the car. The suspension is hydraulically adjustable, and the ride height can drop from 4.7 inches (120 mm) in comfort mode to 2.8 inches (70 mm) in Track or Vmax modes. These drive modes also dynamically adjust the damping component of the suspension, which consists of two springs stacked in series. In Track and Vmax modes, one of these springs is completely locked to increase the overall spring rate of the system. The car also has a front-axle lifting system for clearing road obstacles and steep entry angles.

==== Wheels ====
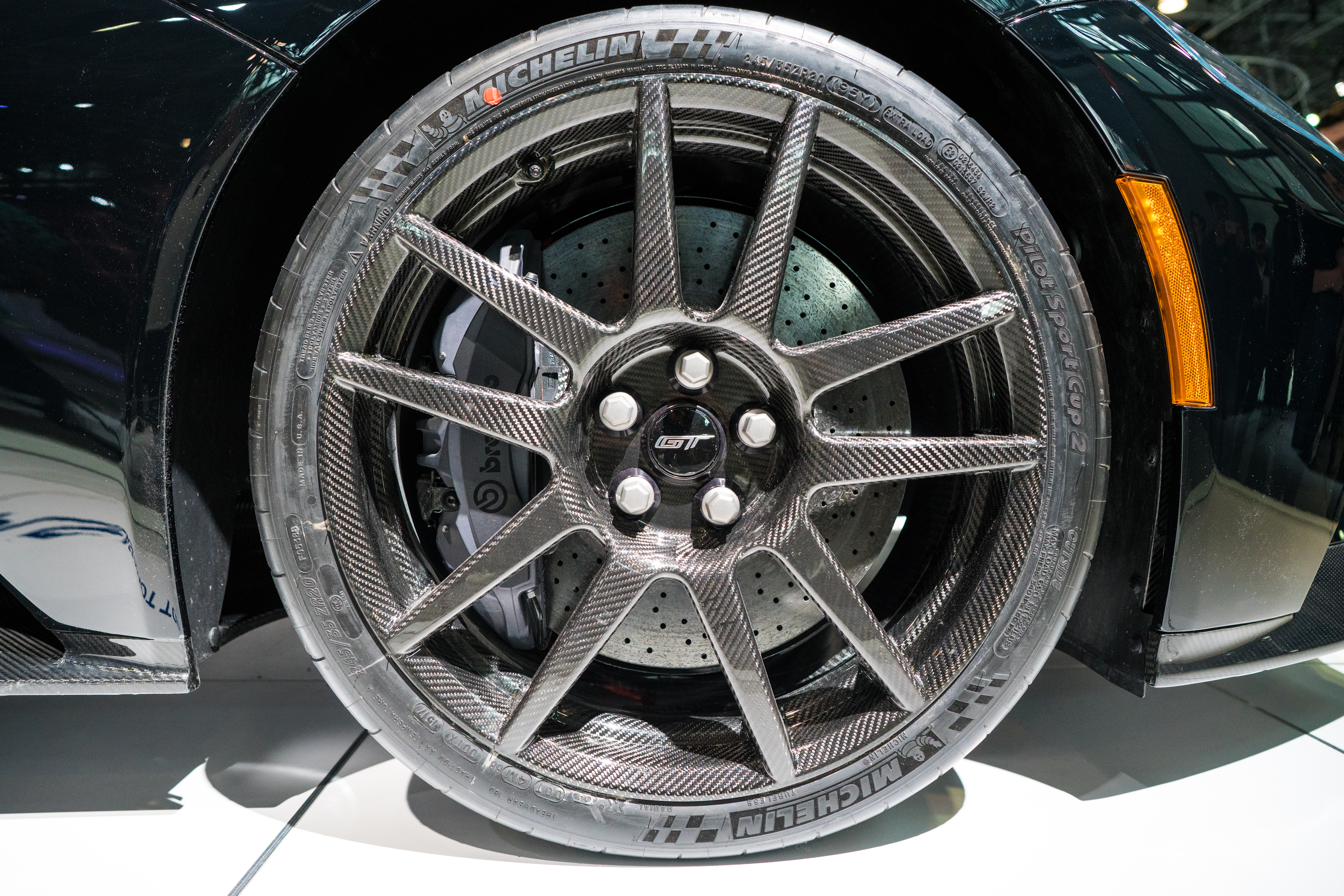
Optional carbon fiber wheels

The new GT is the second Ford vehicle to feature optional carbon fiber wheels, after the Shelby Mustang GT350R. In addition to improved strength and rigidity, these wheels weigh 2 lb (1 kg) less than their forged aluminum counterparts. The wheels have a diameter of 20 inches at the front and rear, and come equipped with Michelin Pilot Sport Cup 2 tires with codes of 245/35 R 20 for the front and 325/30 R 20 for the rear. The brakes are ventilated carbon-ceramic discs made by Brembo, with six-piston calipers at the front and four-piston calipers at the rear.

==== Aerodynamics ====
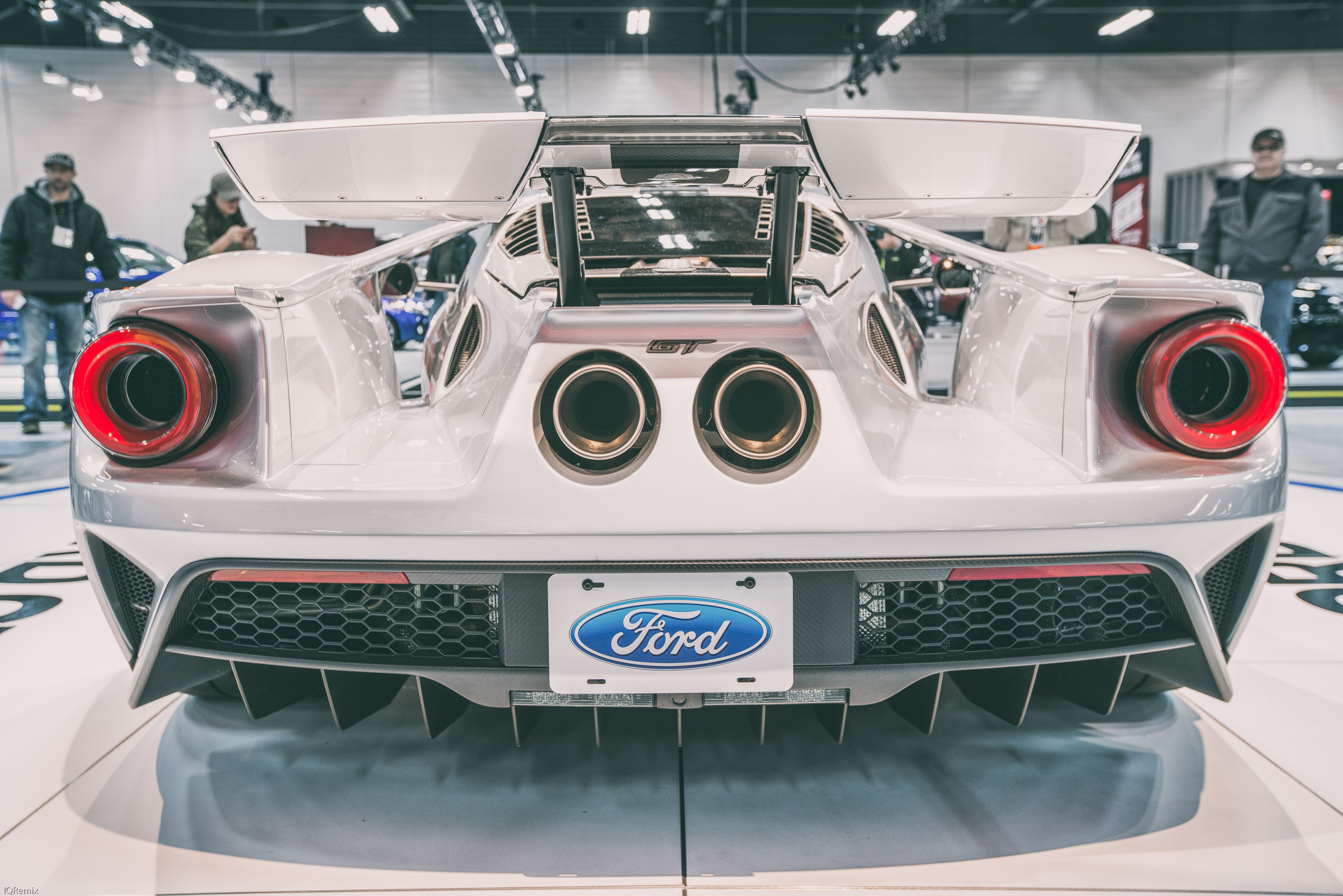
Rear view of flying buttresses and extended spoiler

The most prominent exterior features of the new GT are the open airflow tunnels built into the rear fenders of the car, referred to as the 'flying buttresses'. These large aerodynamic elements, enabled by the compact V6 engine and pushrod suspension design, channel air around the teardrop-shaped cockpit over the rear spoiler for increased downforce. The front end of the GT features a GT40-inspired cutaway nose and vents in the hood that pass oncoming air over the top of the car. The rear features a large diffuser and hollow circular tail lights that expel air taken in by vents built into the flying buttresses.

The active rear spoiler of the GT can adjust and adapt to different driving conditions and modes depending on how much downforce is needed. In Track mode, a gurney flap will extend from the trailing edge of the wing to further increase downforce, and the wing will flip vertical to help stop the car under heavy braking.

=== Performance ===
The GT has a claimed top speed of 216 mph (348 km/h), and has a power to weight ratio of 0.43 hp (0.32 kW) per kilogram. In steady-state cornering on a skidpad, the GT can achieve 1.11 g of lateral acceleration, and the car is capable of braking from 70 mph (113 km/h) to a stop in 145 ft (44 m). Independent acceleration figures are provided below.

- 1/4 mile (402 m): 10.8 seconds at 134 mph (216 km/h)
- 0-60 mph (97 km/h): 3.0 seconds
- 0-100 mph (161 km/h): 6.2 seconds
- 0-130 mph (209 km/h): 10.1 seconds
- 0-150 mph (241 km/h): 14.5 seconds
- 0-170 mph (274 km/h): 21.4 seconds

At the Willow Springs International Raceway, Motor Trend test driver Randy Pobst achieved a hot lap time of 1:23.69 in a 2017 GT, which at the time made it the fourth-fastest road car tested between the 2015 Porsche 918 Spyder (1:23.54) and the 2017 Porsche 911 Turbo S (1:24.26). After suffering from mechanical issues during an earlier test by automotive magazine Car and Driver, racing driver Billy Johnson set a lap time around Virginia International Raceway of 2:38.62 in a 2017 GT. This places it third overall in Car and Driver's testing history at the circuit, after the 2019 Chevrolet Corvette ZR1 (2:37.3) and the 2018 Porsche 911 GT2 RS Weissach (2:37.8).

=== Production ===
Production began in December 2016 and is scheduled to continue through 2022, with a planned production rate of one car per day at Multimatic's low-volume assembly facility in Markham, Ontario, Canada. Approximately two hundred 2017 and 2018 year production cars were recalled to fix potential hydraulic leaking and fire risk. The cars produced for the 2017 and 2018 model years are allocated through Ford Performance's vehicle allocation process. The cars produced for the 2019 model year were primarily for buyers unsuccessful in the initial selection process, and the cars produced for the 2020 model year were for new customers.

==== 2020 model year update ====
For the 2020 model year, the Ford GT received an update that introduced several mechanical upgrades and new special editions. The 3.5 L EcoBoost V6 was uprated at 660 hp (492 kW; 669 PS) due to gallery-cooled pistons and more powerful ignition coils. New engine tuning also results in a 'broader torque band' according to Ford, although peak torque output remains unchanged. The updated GT also comes standard with a new titanium exhaust system developed by Akrapovič, which saves 9 lb (4 kg) over the original exhaust. The suspension stiffness in Track mode has also been further increased, and cooling airflow into the flying buttresses has been improved by new vent design in this updated model.

==== Special editions ====
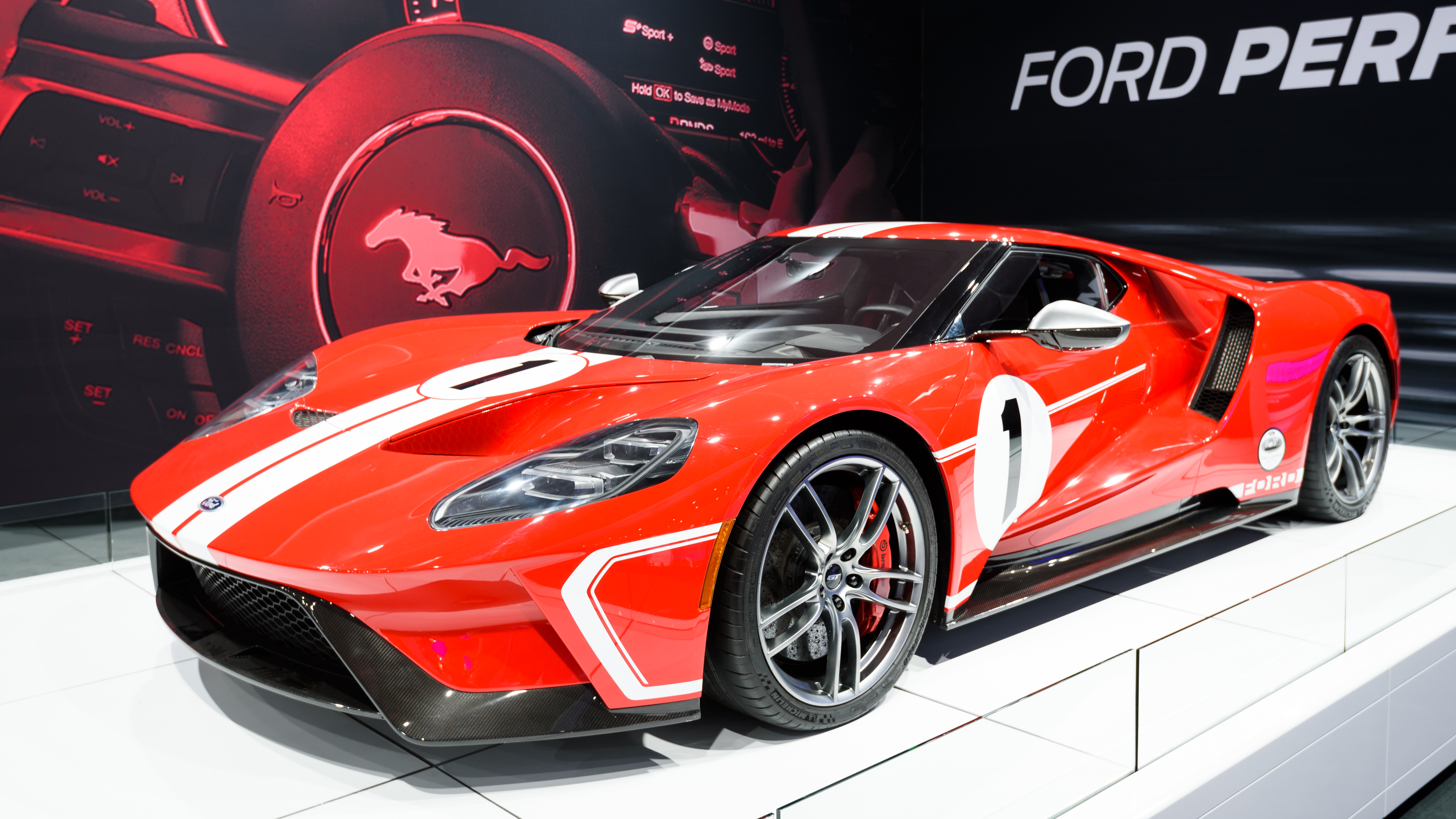
'67 Heritage Edition (2018)

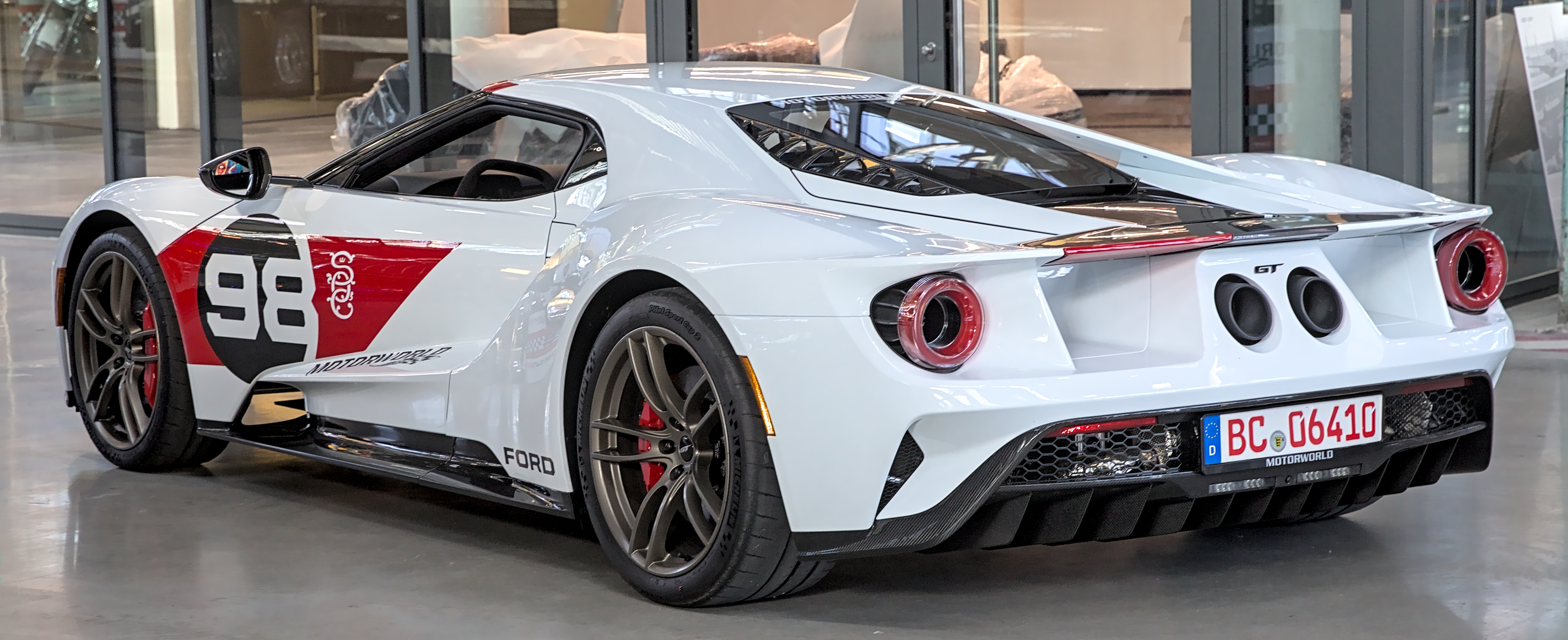
'66 Heritage Edition (2021)

There have been a number of special edition series for the new GT, often involving unique liveries, materials, or interior changes. These special editions include:

- Competition Series (2017–2018): The closest one can get to the car that won the 2016 Le Mans, with all optional carbon fiber parts fitted, with interior weight savings from deletion of A/C, radio hardware, and storage bins.
- '66 Heritage Edition (2017): Matte or metallic black paint with #2 graphics to honor the winning GT40 Mk II at the 1966 24 Hours of Le Mans.
- '67 Heritage Edition (2018): Race red paint with #1 graphics to honor the winning GT40 Mk IV at the 1967 24 Hours of Le Mans.
- '68–'69 Heritage Edition (2019–2020): Blue and orange Gulf Oil livery with #9 (2019) or #6 (2020) graphics to honor the back to back wins at the 1968 and 1969 24 Hours of Le Mans by the GT40 Mk I.
- Liquid Carbon (2020): Exposed carbon fiber body and wheels for the 2020 model year, at an increased price of US$750,000.
- '66 Heritage Edition (2021): White, red, and carbon exterior with #98 graphics to honor the GT40 Mk II's win at the 1966 24 Hours of Daytona.
- '64 Heritage Edition (2022): White with black accents to mimic the livery of the sole remaining GT40 prototype car, the 1964 GT/105.
- Alan Mann Heritage Edition (2022): Signature Alan Mann Racing livery in red and gold to tribute to Alan Mann Racing's 1966 Ford GT lightweight experimental prototypes.
- Holman Moody Heritage Edition (2022): Gold and red livery to honor the podium-placing Holman Moody GT40 Mk II, chassis no. P/1016.
- LM Edition (2022): Painted in Liquid Silver with a choice of either red or blue accents, as tribute to the 2016 Le Mans-winning GT, which wore a red and blue livery.

=== GT Mk II ===
A track-day-only version of the new GT, named the GT Mk II, was launched on 4 July 2019 at the Goodwood Festival of Speed. The name pays homage to the original GT40 Mk II race car that won the 1966 24 Hours of Le Mans.

The GT Mk II features many substantial changes from the road car that increase its capabilities on the track. The 3.5 L EcoBoost V6 engine has been tuned and is rated at over 700 hp (522 kW; 710 PS), which is cooled by a roof-mounted air intake and new outboard-mounted intercoolers. The removal of the adjustable ride height system and the stripped-out interior reduces the overall weight of the Mk II by about 200 pounds (91 kg) over the road car. The active spoiler has been replaced by a much larger fixed wing, which in combination with a larger diffuser and new aerodynamic elements results in a 400% increase in downforce over the road car. The GT Mk II uses smaller 19-inch wheels and Michelin Pilot Sport GT slick racing tires, although it shares the GT's carbon ceramic brakes.

As a result of these changes, the GT Mk II is not street legal. Only 45 will be built, and at a unit price of US$1.2 million it is the most expensive Ford ever sold. The Mk II, however, is not sold by Ford but rather directly to customers by Multimatic, the Canadian manufacturer of all GT cars.

=== GT Mk IV ===
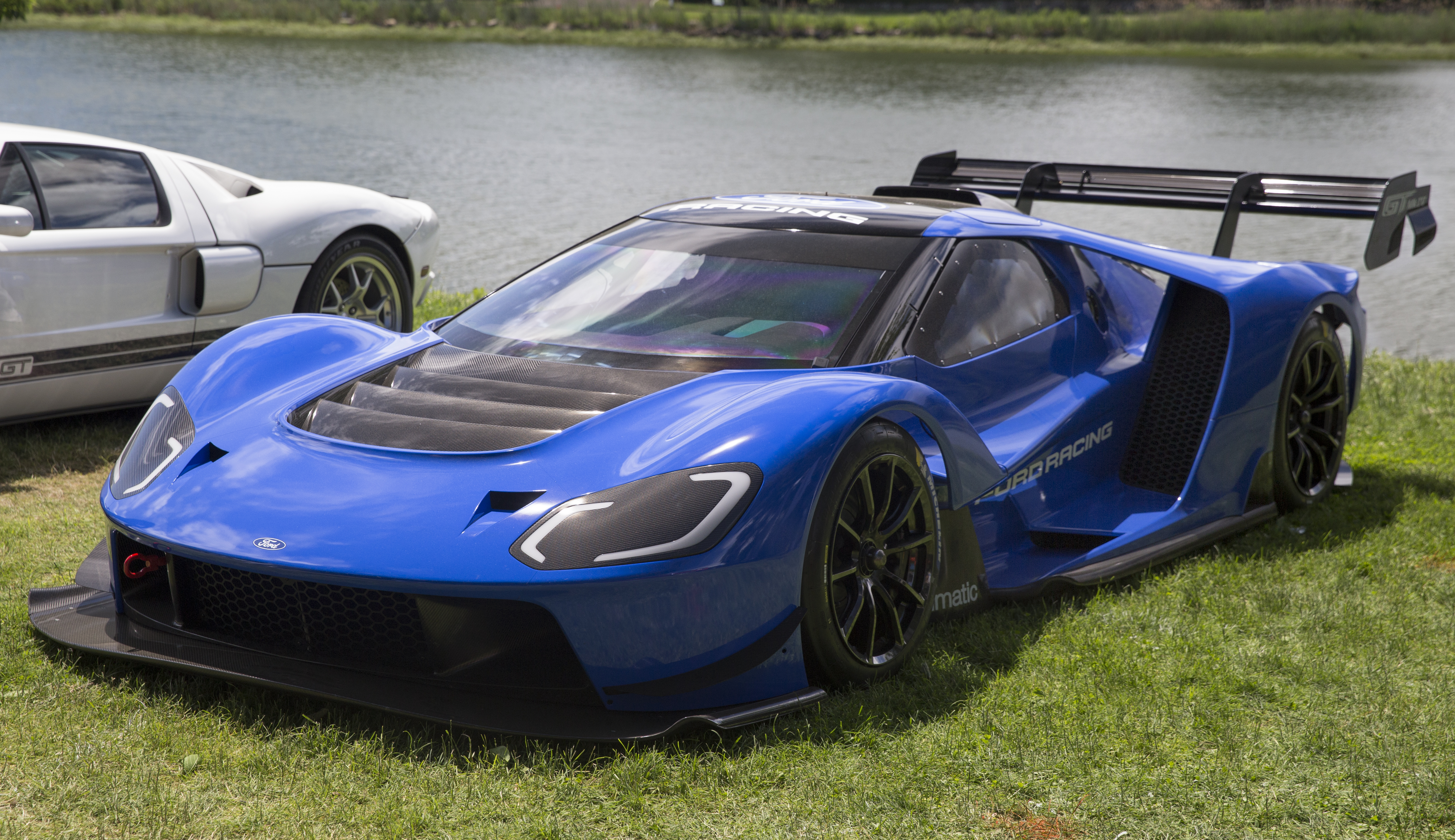
The Ford GT Mk IV

To commemorate Ford's victory at the 1967 24 Hours of Le Mans, Ford and Multimatic built another track-only Ford GT inspired by the Ford GT40 Mk IV, priced at $1.7 million; the car targets more than 800 horsepower as a performance figure. 67 examples will be built by Ford as a final sendoff to the Ford GT. As of April 2026, the Ford GT Mk IV had set the fastest lap time at the Nürburgring Nordschleife for a production car solely powered by an internal combustion engine, at 6:15.997.

== Racing ==
=== Overview ===
The Ford GT has been campaigned in various racing venues. These include:

- A highly modified GT was raced in 2006 and 2007 in Super GT's GT300 class in Japan powered by a 3.5 L Ford Zetec-R engine produced by Cosworth in the mid-1990s for Formula One.
- Matech Concepts from Switzerland entered three Ford GTs modified to GT3 class specifications in the FIA GT3 European Championship. Matech won the Teams title in the 2008 Championship.
- Atlanta-based Robertson Racing entered a Doran-built Ford GT-R in the American Le Mans Series GT class (formerly GT2). The team made its first 24 Hours of Le Mans appearance in 2011, scoring 3rd position overall in the GTE Am Class.
- Black Swan Racing entered a Falken Tires-sponsored Ford GT-R in the GT2 class in the American Le Mans Series during the 2008 season.
- Ford Chip Ganassi Racing formerly ran 4 factory-supported LM-spec Ford GT LM GTE-Pro racecars. Two in the FIA World Endurance Championship under the LM GTE-Pro class during the 2016, 2017, & 2018–19 seasons and two in the WeatherTech SportsCar Championship in the GTLM class during the 2016, 2017, 2018, & 2019 seasons. At the end of the 2019 season, Ganassi announced that it would end their factory race program with Ford after four years.

=== First generation ===
==== Ford GT GT1 ====
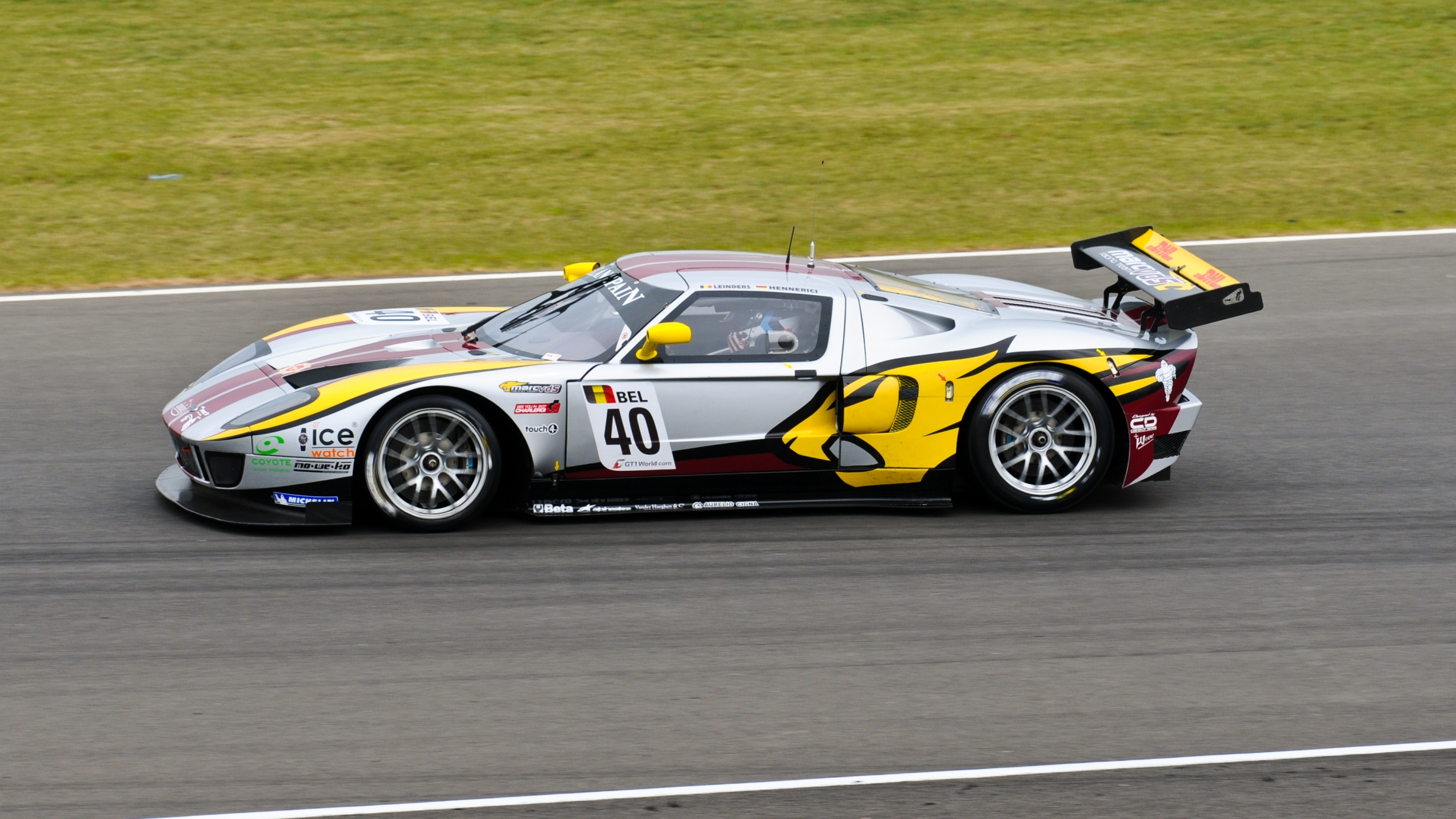
A Ford GT1 in the FIA GT1 World Championship (Silverstone, 2011)

The Ford GT GT1 is a racing version of the Ford GT developed by Matech Concepts to comply with FIA GT1 rules. The car uses the Roush-Yates-supplied 5.3 L Cammer engine, producing 650 hp (485 kW) at 7,400 RPM. It has a six-speed, Xtrac sequential gearbox and carbon fibre body panels mated to the steel tub to reduce the overall weight of the car. The official race debut of the Ford GT1 coincided with the kick-off of the 2009 FIA GT Championship season in Silverstone. For the 2010 FIA GT1 World Championship season four cars were built and fielded by two teams: Matech Competition and Marc VDS Racing Team. Three cars competed in the 2010 24 Hours of Le Mans race, with two (the number 70 car run by the Marc VDS Racing Team and the number 61 car run by Matech Concepts) retiring early on. The third car retired later in the race. For the 2011 FIA GT1 World Championship season, Matech left the series which left Marc VDS running the four cars during the season, two under the Marc VDS Racing Team name and the other two cars under the name of Belgian Racing. A total of six were built by Matech with only four believed to still exist as of 2025.

==== Ford GT-R Mk. VII ====
Ford GT-R Mk. VII
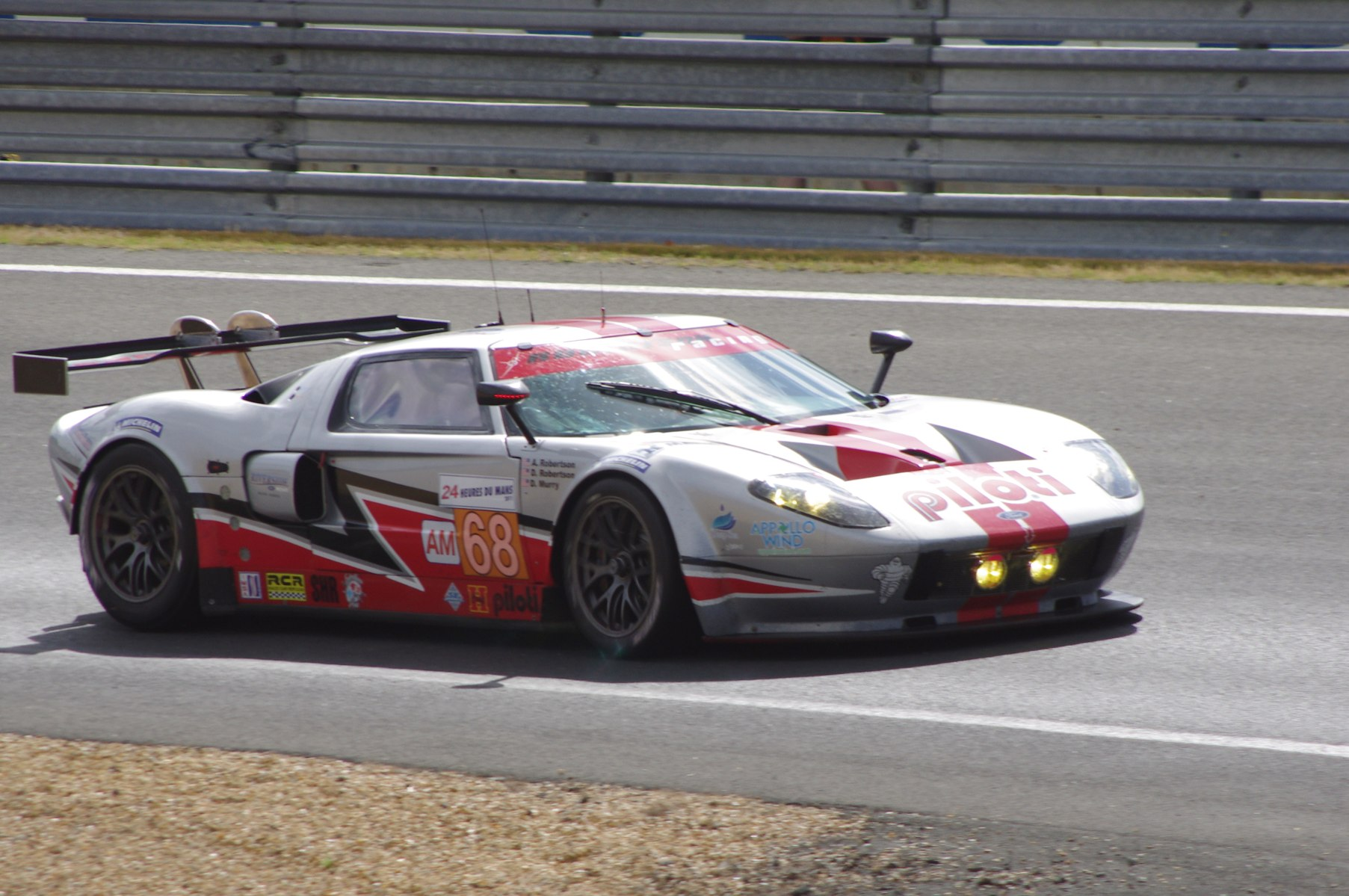
- The No. 68 Robertson Racing Ford GT-R Mk. VII during the 2011 24 Hours of Le Mans
- Category: Group GT2
- Constructor: Doran Enterprises
- Designers: Kevin Doran; Oliver Kuttner
- Production: 2008–2011

Technical specifications
- Chassis: superplastic-formed frame with carbon fiber body panels
- Suspension: Öhlins four-way adjustable dampers with Eibach springs
- Length: 182.8 in (4,643 mm)
- Width: 76.9 in (1,953 mm)
- Height: 44.3 in (1,125 mm)
- Axle track: Front: 63.0 in (1,599 mm); Rear: 63.7 in (1,618 mm)
- Wheelbase: 106.7 in (2,710 mm)
- Engine: Ford Cammer 4,992 cc (5.0 L; 304.6 cu in) V8 90° N/A, 32-valve, DOHC mid-mounted, longitudinally-mounted
- Torque: 443 lb⋅ft (600 N⋅m)
- Transmission: EMCO 6-speed sequential
- Power: 500 hp (507 PS; 373 kW)
- Weight: 2,480.2 lb (1,125 kg)
- Brakes: Front: Cast iron ventilated discs with AP Racing 6-piston monoblock caliper Rear: Cast iron discs with AP Racing 4-piston monoblock caliper
- Tyres: Dunlop; Falken; Michelin

Competition history
- Notable entrants: (United States) ACS Express Racing (United States) Black Swan Racing (United States) Robertson Racing
- Notable drivers: (United Kingdom) Rob Bell (United States) Townsend Bell (United States) Colin Braun (United States) Brandon Davis (United States) Anthony Lazzaro (United States) David Murry (United States) Tim Pappas (United States) Andy Pilgrim (United States) Boris Said (United States) Craig Stanton
- Debut: 2008 12 Hours of Sebring
- Last event: 2011 Petit Le Mans
Races	Wins	Podiums	Poles	F/Laps
37	0	2	0	0
- Teams' Championships: 0
- Constructors' Championships: 0
- Drivers' Championships: 0

The Group GT2 version of the Ford GT was built by Ohio-based Doran Enterprises and named Ford GT-R Mk. VII. The project began in 2006 as the brainchild of Oliver Kuttner and fully realized by Kevin Doran and his company, Doran Enterprise. Robertson Racing would place the first order in late 2007 (chassis #002). With their crew chief, Andrew "H" Smith, they would finish what was a mostly empty chassis before its first race at Sebring. Black Swan Racing also placed an order for a GT-R Mk. VII. A total of three chassis were built.

It features a 5.0 liter Ford Cammer dry sump engine, built by Élan and prepared by Roush-Yates, mated to a 6-speed EMCO sequential transaxle. Other upgrades include a wider track, new suspension geometry, and a more aerodynamic body with fender flares and additional front and rear spoilers. A removable rear panel covering the engine was made out of carbon for quick access and reduced weight. Brakes have been upgraded to ventilated six- and four-piston Brembo calipers at the front and rear.

Robertson Racing entered the car's first race at the 2008 12 Hours of Sebring with drivers, Andrea Robertson, David Robertson and David Murry. The debut race would end in a retirement after David Robertson crashed into the turn 13 barrier in the eighth hour. Poor results through the first four rounds of the American Le Mans Series season, including another retirement at the Utah Grand Prix, after contact with an Audi R10 TDI. Black Swan Racing (chassis #003), backed by Falken Tire, would join Robertson Racing and made its debut at the following round at Lime Rock which would continue through to the end of the season. Both teams would not have much success with the car in its first season, Black Swan Racing taking its highest finish of the year of eighth at Laguna Seca.

The 2009 American Le Mans Series season saw a solo effort by Robertson Racing where they finished as high as sixth in class at St. Petersburg. The results were lackluster like the previous year, mostly finishing toward the rear of the GT2 field. However, they did manage to score points in nine of ten rounds of the season. Robertson Racing then fielded the car in the 1000 km of Okayama in the 2009 Asian Le Mans Series. They wound up finishing sixth in class with drivers, Andrea Robertson, David Robertson and David Murry.

In 2010, at a preseason testing event at Sebring, a crash resulted in chassis #002 sustaining severe damage to one of the rear chassis castings. Chassis #004 was built by Doran, cannibalizing any parts that survived form the crash chassis, for the start of the 2010 American Le Mans Series season. Murry and the Robertsons campaigned the GT-R Mk. VII for a third straight year with mediocre results. At the Grand Prix of Mosport, Andrea Robertson made contact with Dirk Müller's BMW at turn 9, retiring on the spot. The final race of the season at the Petit Le Mans saw the largest contingent of GT-R Mk. VII's with two entries from Robertson Racing (chassis #002 and #004) and one from ACS Express Racing, who had purchased chassis #003 from Black Swan Racing. In the third practice session of the weekend, Brandon Davis aboard the #10 ACS Express Racing entry, had a major accident, which caused extensive damage to the chassis which ended up being a complete write off. The #04 Robertson car with Rob Bell, Anthony Lazzaro and David Murry finished eighth in GT while the #40 entry finished 12th with Andrea Robertson, David Robertson and Craig Stanton at the wheel.

The 2011 season began at Sebring with two cars for Robertson Racing. #004 retired with starter motor issues while the #040 finished eighth in class. The team elected to skip the next race at Long Beach to focus on the 24 Hours of Le Mans test. At the test, they had some contact with other cars and a malfunctioning pit speed limiter but completed the required ten laps of the Circuit de La Sarthe.

The drivers for the 24 Hours of Le Mans were David Murry, Andrea Robertson and David Robertson. In qualifying, Murry sets a 4:08.208, lining the team up in 55th on the grid, beating out only the #64 Lotus Jetalliance entry. The car suffered a left rear puncture in the fifth hour but managed to make it back to the pits. In the seventh hour they had issues with the paddle shift and had to disconnect and reinstall their sequential shift system. In the 23rd hour, the third place JMB Racing Ferrari had to twice enter the garage for clutch repairs, which allowed the Robertson GT-R Mk. VII to claw back the position from seven laps down to take the final podium place.

Roberston Racing continued their dual car campaign and followed up the Le Mans podium with another third place finish at the 2011 Northeast Grand Prix for the #04 of Anthony Lazzaro and Murry. The team completed the rest of the American Le Mans Series season, finishing seventh in the standings, before winding down their racing operations to focus on historic racing, thus ending the GT-R Mk. VII's career.

==== Ford GT GT3 ====
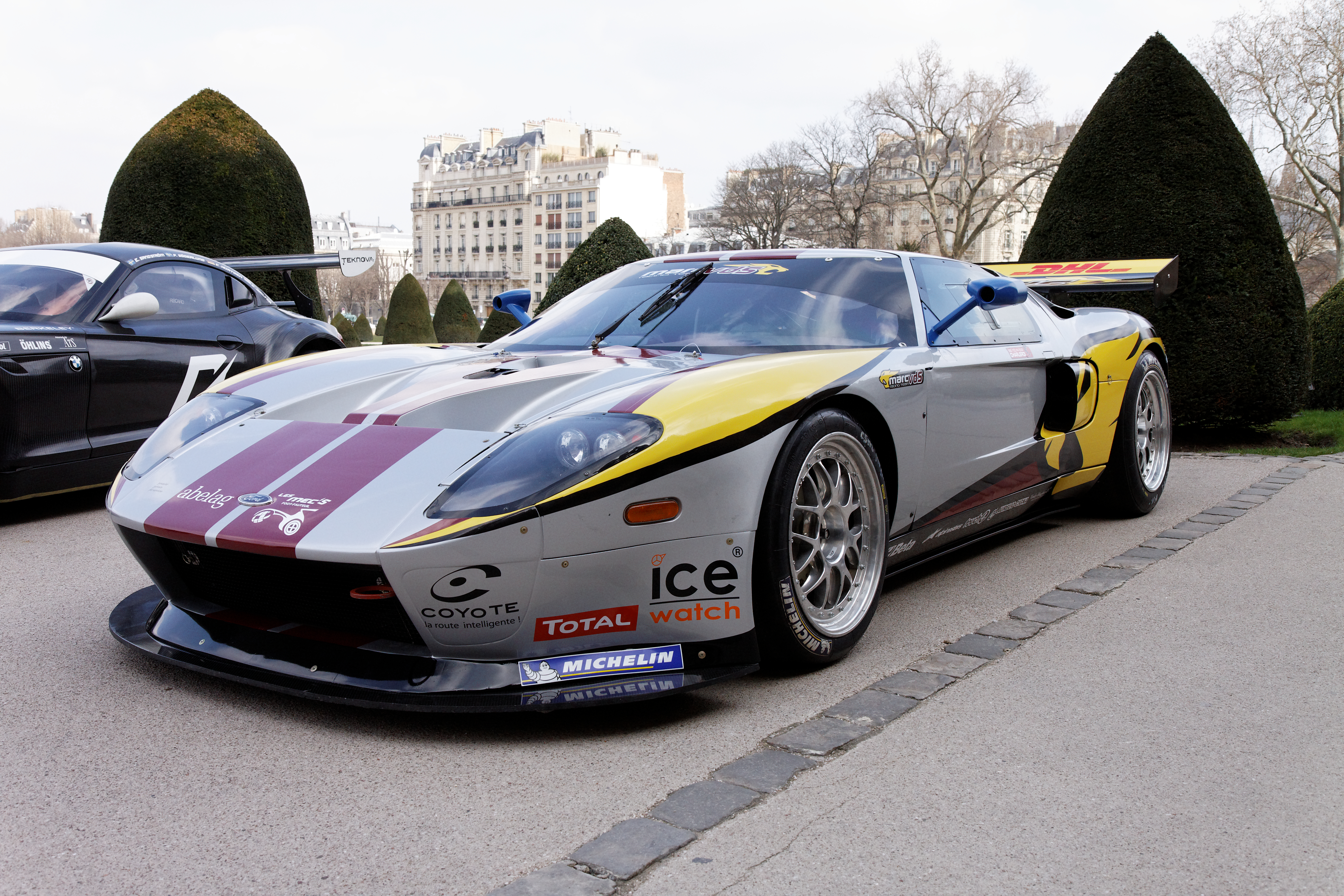
Ford GT GT3

The Ford GT was also homologated for the FIA GT3 rules by Matech Concepts. The Ford GT GT3 was involved in numerous championships including the FIA GT3 European Championship, FIA GT1 World Championship, Blancpain Endurance Series, and others. The GT3 version is slower than the GT1 version (rated at around 500 hp (373 kW) instead of 600 hp (447 kW)) and features different bodywork.

=== Second generation ===
Ford GT (LM GTE-Pro)
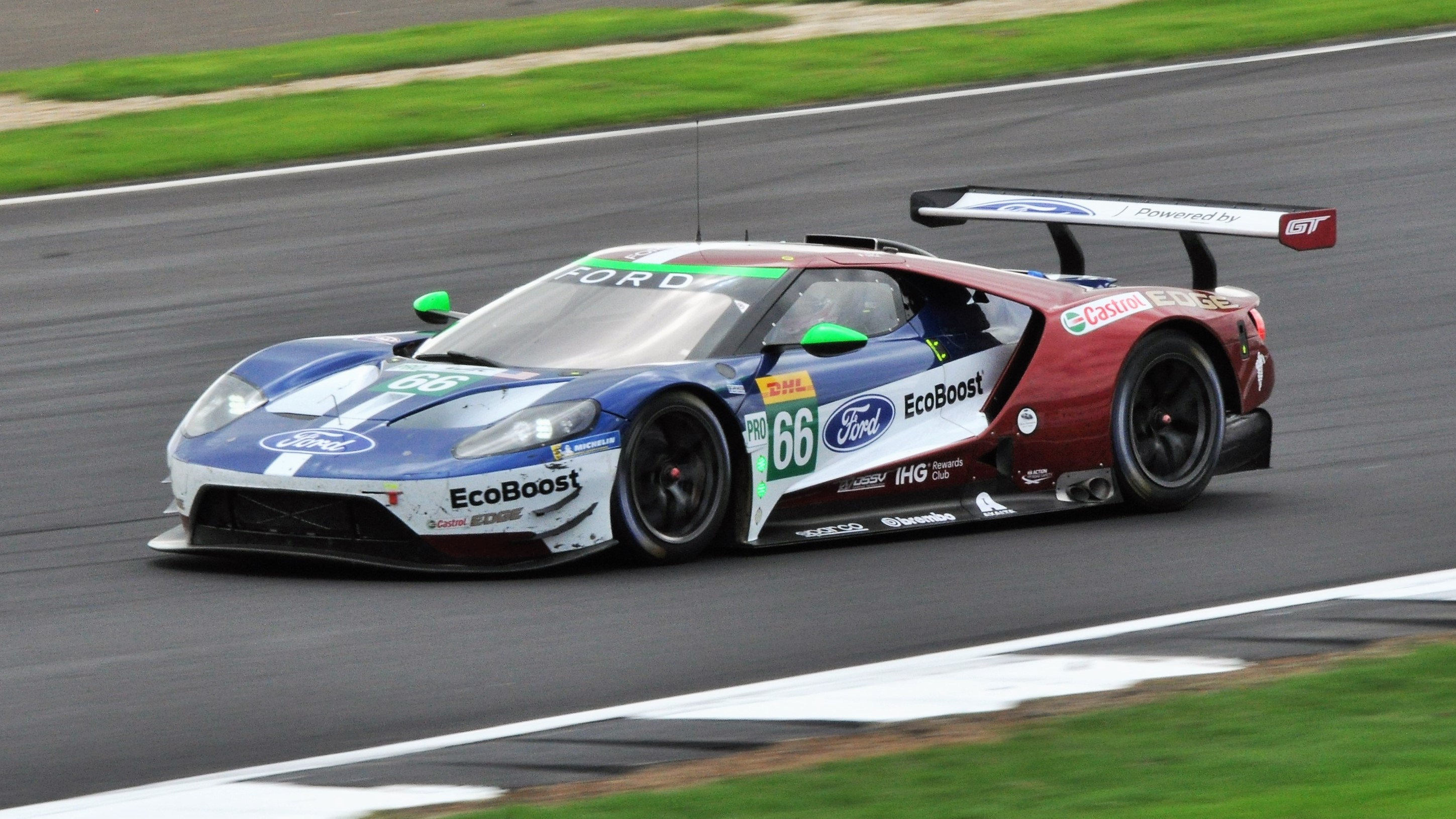
- The No. 66 Ford GT LM GTE-Pro, which competed at the 2018 6 Hours of Silverstone
- Category: Weathertech SportsCar GTLM and World Endurance Championship LM GTE-Pro
- Constructor: (United States) Ford Performance (Multimatic)
- Designer: Chris Svensson (styling)
- Successor: Ford Mustang GT3 (S650) (LM GT3)

Technical specifications
- Chassis: Carbon-fibre monocoque with safety roll cage
- Suspension (front): Unequal length double wishbone with pushrod-actuated torsion bars and Multimatic DSSV dampers
- Suspension (rear): As front
- Length: 4,763 mm (188 in; 16 ft)
- Width: 2,045 mm (81 in; 7 ft)
- Height: 1,030 mm (41 in; 3 ft)
- Wheelbase: 2,710 mm (107 in; 9 ft)
- Engine: Ford EcoBoost D35 3.5 L (214 cu in) V6 60° twin-turbocharged, mid-engine, longitudinally-mounted
- Transmission: Ricardo 6-speed sequential semi-automatic paddle shift Limited slip ramp/plate differential
- Battery: Braille AGM (13 volts)
- Power: Over 500 PS (493 hp; 368 kW), 500 N⋅m (370 ft⋅lbf) torque
- Weight: 1,200 kg (2,646 lb) excluding driver, fluids and fuel; 1,310 kg (2,888 lb) including driver, fluids and fuel
- Fuel: VP Racing Fuels MS100 RON unleaded 80% + Ethanol E20 20% (IMSA SportsCar)/Shell V-Power LM24 98 RON unleaded (WEC and Le Mans 24 Hours (2016-2017))/Total Excellium LM24 98 RON unleaded 80% + Ethanol E20 (WEC and Le Mans 24 Hours (2018-2019))
- Lubricants: Castrol EDGE SUPERCAR
- Brakes: Six piston front Brembo calipers. Four piston rear Brembo calipers. Vented Brembo discs
- Tyres: Michelin Pilot Sport; BBS wheels

Competition history
- Notable entrants: (United States) Ford Chip Ganassi Team USA (IMSA SC) (United Kingdom) Ford Chip Ganassi Team UK joint venture with Multimatic Motorsports (FIA WEC) (United States) Keating Motorsports
- Notable drivers: (United States) Joey Hand; (Germany) Dirk Müller; (France) Sébastien Bourdais; (Australia) Ryan Briscoe; (United Kingdom) Richard Westbrook; (Germany) Stefan Mücke; (New Zealand) Scott Dixon; (France) Olivier Pla; (United States) Billy Johnson; (United Kingdom) Andy Priaulx; (United Kingdom) Harry Tincknell; (United Kingdom) Marino Franchitti; (Brazil) Tony Kanaan; (Brazil) Pipo Derani; (United States) Ben Keating; (Netherlands) Jeroen Bleekemolen; (Brazil) Felipe Fraga
- Debut: 2016 24 Hours of Daytona (IMSA); 2016 6 Hours of Silverstone (WEC)
- First win: 2016 Monterey Grand Prix (IMSA); 2016 24 Hours of Le Mans (WEC)
- Last win: 2018 6 Hours of Spa-Francorchamps (WEC); 2019 Monterey Grand Prix (IMSA)
- Last event: 2019 24 Hours of Le Mans (WEC); 2019 Petit Le Mans (IMSA)
Races	Wins
44 (IMSA); 26 (WEC)	13 (IMSA); 6 (WEC)
- Constructors' Championships: 1 (IMSA 2018)
- Drivers' Championships: 0

==== Ford GT LM GTE-Pro by Ford Chip Ganassi Racing ====
On 12 June 2015, at Le Mans, it was announced that Ford will return to the 24 Hours of Le Mans in 2016 with a factory-supported, four-car effort operating as Ford Chip Ganassi Racing with the LM-spec Ford GT LM GTE-Pro. The Ford Chip Ganassi Racing cars campaigned in both the IMSA WeatherTech SportsCar Championship and the FIA World Endurance Championship. The car debuted at the 2016 24 Hours of Daytona on January 30–31 finishing seventh and ninth in class.

On June 19, 2016, the #68 Ford GT of Ford Chip Ganassi Racing finished first at the 24 Hours of Le Mans in the LM GTE-Pro class; the victory marked fifty years after Ford won the 24 Hours of Le Mans in 1966, where they came first, second, and third with the GT40. At the 2016 6 Hours of Fuji and the 6 Hours of Shanghai, both the Ford GT's finished 1–2 at both races, the #67 winning both and the #66 coming second in both.

In the 2017 opening WEC race at Silverstone, the #67 Ford GT took victory. Two races later, on June 19, 2017, the #67 Ford GT of Ford Chip Ganassi Racing finished runner up at the 24 Hours of Le Mans in the LM GTE-Pro class; this time fifty years after the second Le Mans Race win in 1967.

===== List of race victories =====
Year	No.	Event	Circuit	Series
2016	1	Continental Tire Monterey Grand Prix	(United States) Mazda Raceway Laguna Seca	IMSA
2016	2	24 Hours of Le Mans	(France) Circuit de La Sarthe	WEC
2016	3	Sahlen's Six Hours of the Glen	(United States) Watkins Glen International	IMSA
2016	4	Mobil 1 SportsCar Grand Prix	(Canada) Canadian Tire Motorsport Park	IMSA
2016	5	6 Hours of Fuji	(Japan) Fuji Speedway	WEC
2016	6	6 Hours of Shanghai	(China) Shanghai International Circuit	WEC
2017	7	Rolex 24 at Daytona	(United States) Daytona International Speedway	IMSA
2017	8	6 Hours of Silverstone	(United Kingdom) Silverstone Circuit	WEC
2017	9	Continental Tire Road Race Showcase	(United States) Road America	IMSA
2017	10	6 Hours of Shanghai	(China) Shanghai International Circuit	WEC
2018	11	Rolex 24 at Daytona	(United States) Daytona International Speedway	IMSA
2018	12	6 Hours of Spa-Francorchamps	(Belgium) Circuit de Spa-Francorchamps	WEC
2018	13	Sahlen's Six Hours of the Glen	(United States) Watkins Glen International	IMSA
2018	14	Mobil 1 SportsCar Grand Prix	(Canada) Canadian Tire Motorsport Park	IMSA
2018	15	Northeast Grand Prix	(United States) Lime Rock Park	IMSA
2018	16	Continental Tire Road Race Showcase	(United States) Road America	IMSA
2019	17	Northeast Grand Prix	(United States) Lime Rock Park	IMSA
2019	18	IMSA Road Race Showcase	(United States) Road America	IMSA
2019	19	IMSA Monterey Grand Prix	(United States) WeatherTech Raceway Laguna Seca	IMSA

== See also ==
- Galpin GTR1
