= Hot metal gas forming =

Hot metal gas forming (HMGF) is a method of die forming in which a metal tube is heated to a pliable state, near to but below its melting point, then pressurized internally by a gas in order to form the tube outward into the shape defined by an enclosing die cavity. The high temperatures allow the metal to elongate, or stretch, to much greater degrees without rupture than are possible in previously utilized cold and warm forming methods. In addition, the metal can be formed into finer details and requires less overall forming force than traditional methods.

== History and comparison with previous techniques ==
HMGF is an evolution in the cost effectiveness and applicability of several existing commercial processes: superplastic forming, hot blow forming, and hydroforming.

Complex tubes can be made from multiple sheet components formed and welded together, but this adds unnecessary cost and creates quality concerns at the joints. Hydroforming uses liquid under extreme pressures to form metal tubes. It was developed for the plumbing industry and by 1990 achieved production efficiencies suited for high volume autos. Typically hydroforming is done at ambient temperatures, and limits the forming elongation of metals to 8–12% diameter increase for aluminum, and 25–40% for steel. This limits the part shape complexity that can be produced. In addition, the workcenters and tooling can be large and expensive because of the internal fluid pressures required to form ambient tubes. HMGF is able to form tubes with larger shape complexity in only one forming step and generally at a lower internal pressure than in conventional tube hydroforming.

Blow forming started with glass long ago, and is now a widespread method for forming plastic into hollow structures. Again, the heated material properties provide for many processing advantages. Warm forming has been the subject of extensive research in the past decades. It is defined as forming above ambient but below the recrystallization temperature of an alloy, and using hydroform principles, can be done on tubes. Temperatures are typically limited due to safety concerns surrounding the heated forming fluids. At these temperatures, cycle times may still be relatively long, and elongations still do not approach that of hot forming.

Superplastic forming is often applied in the aerospace industry, but it requires the use of very fine grain metal alloys, deformed up to very large strain values, but at a very low strain rate. HMGF is therefore potentially faster than superplastic forming.

As a natural evolution, the need for HMGF created research starting in the 1990s. Fast cycle times, inexpensive tooling and machinery resulting from pressures an order of magnitude lower than hydroforming, and extreme forming ratios due to high temperature forming create a compelling business case for high volume low cost manufacturing.

In 1999, development of the HMGF techniques began as an Advanced Technology Program (ATP) project funded by the US National Institute of Standards and Technology (NIST). This project completed in 1993 and research showed up to 150% expansion ratios for aluminum and 50% with steel were possible, with further expansion capabilities by use of end feeding of material to minimize wall thinning.

In order to keep pace with the US research, a European project was funded by the Research Fund for Coal and Steel (RFCS). Starting in July 2004, with a duration of 3 years, this project further investigated the HMGF process. By 2007, the consortium of European research and commercial entities proved concepts of simpler heating and die construction, and while focusing on the more demanding steel alloys, illustrated free deformation of 140% by use of end feeding to control wall thinning and delay rupture. The method used in these experiments is patented under U.S. patent 7,285,761.

Also in Europe, parallel research yielded an innovative approach to the concept. By 2006, the HEATform method of hot metal gas forming showed evidence of unique metal shapes that had "historically only been possible in the domain of glass blowing and blow molded parts" with aluminum forming in excess of 270% expansion ratio at a production intended cycle time of 20 seconds. Citing that hardening and subsequent breakage will limit forming of the aluminum alloy below 460 °C (860 °F), the best flow behavior was observed at 550 °C (1,022 °F). This is significantly higher than the capabilities of warm liquid or warm gas pressure forming. The HEATform techniques of end feeding control achieved uniform wall thickness up to 300% strain values.

While significant research into material compatibility and predictive analysis techniques is ongoing, hot metal gas forming has been commercialized by at least one company who is providing hot expansion coupled with material end feeding.

== Applications ==
Typical applications are in the automotive and aerospace industries where the precursor technology of hydroforming is well known. Other applications include sports equipment and furniture. The multi-material capability are used in decorative workpieces and plumbing fixtures.

== Materials ==
The HMGF process is compatible with almost any metal. The most significant benefit of HMGF is that cold form resistant materials become viable for complex forming. Often, alloys are enhanced with expensive materials to enable cold forming and increase machinability, however with HMFG a less expensive alloy can be used, which reduces piece prices. One example is the use of ferritic stainless steels, like the 1.4512 alloy for exhaust components. Typically, the more expensive austenitic stainless is chosen, like the 1.4301 alloy, for parts requiring complex forming due to its 40% advantage in ambient formability (38.5% vs. 27.4% typical A%). Hardenable metal alloys (e.g. boron steels) can be used in HMGF. In this case the die can be used not only as a shaping tool, but also as a tempering tool, so that the final hardness of the formed tube after forming and cooling is increased. The process is often called "press hardening" in this case.
