= Galpin GTR1 =

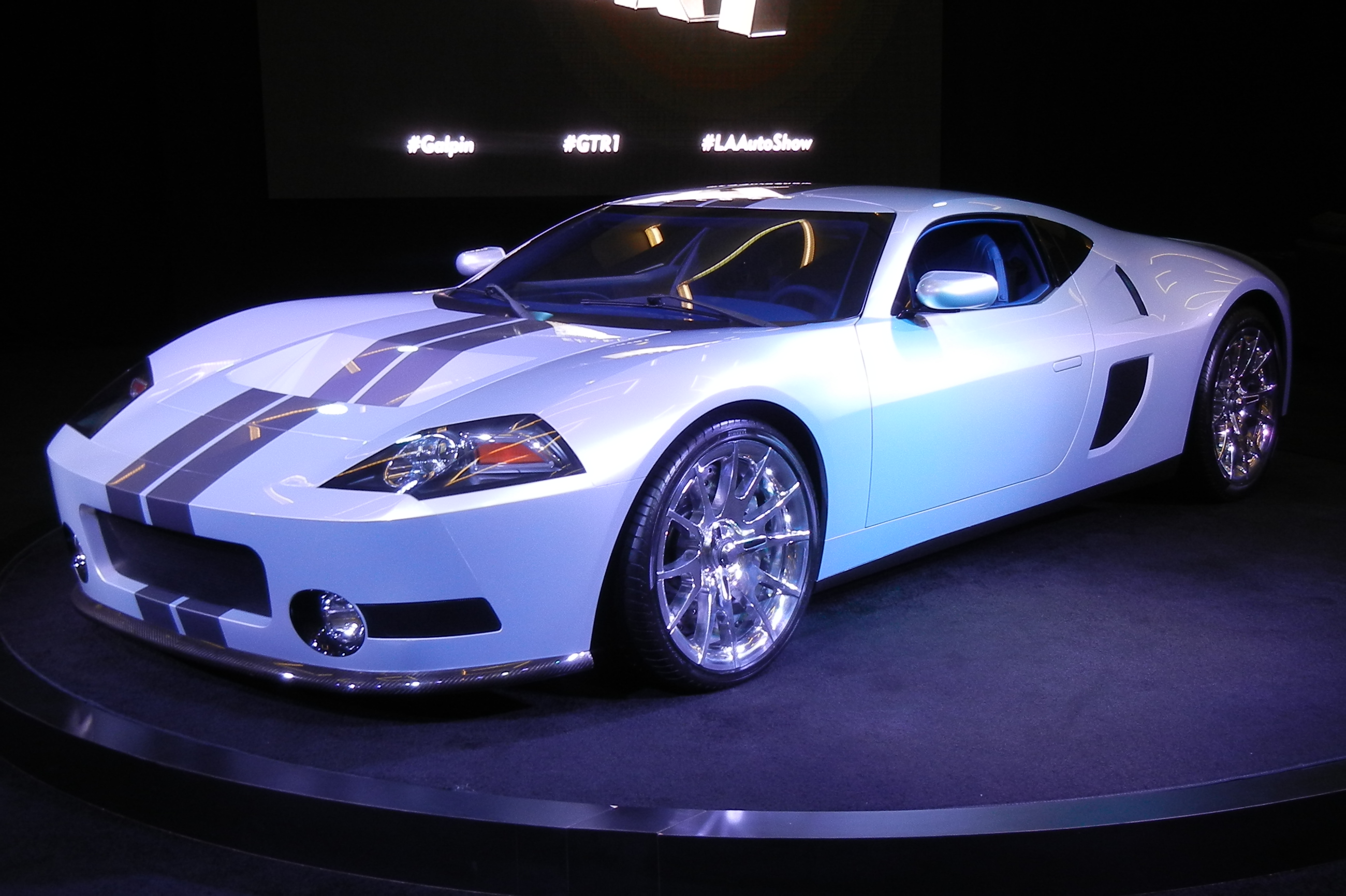
- Galpin GTR1 at the 2013 LA Auto Show

Overview
- Manufacturer: Galpin Auto Sports
- Also called: Galpin Ford GTR1
- Production: 2013–2016
- Assembly: California

Body and chassis
- Class: Sports car (S)
- Body style: 2-door Coupe
- Layout: RMR layout
- Related: Ford GT

Powertrain
- Engine: 5.4L twin-turbocharged V8
- Transmission: 6-speed manual

The Galpin GTR1 (sometimes referred to as the Galpin Ford GTR1) is a custom sports car based on the Ford GT developed and built by American automotive company Galpin Auto Sports. The car was unveiled at Pebble Beach in 2013. Galpin had planned to make at least six cars in 2014, with the possibility of another 18 to follow, based on demand.

== Specifications ==
In 2013, Galpin Auto Sports utilized the mechanical underpinnings of a Ford GT as basis to build the GTR1. The GTR1 has a 5.4L twin-turbocharged V8, capable of producing 1,024 hp (764 kW; 1,038 PS) and 739 lb⋅ft (1,002 N⋅m) of torque, which enables the car to accelerate from 0 to 60 mph (97 km/h) in about 3 seconds, and reach an advertised top speed of 225 mph (362 km/h). However, if the GTR1 is fuelled with 100-octane fuel, the power and torque outputs are boosted to respectively 1,197 hp (893 kW; 1,214 PS) and 887 lb⋅ft (1,203 N⋅m) of torque. The hand-built, all-aluminum chassis features carbon fiber detailing, and LED headlights, and is about 5 in (127 mm) wider than the standard Ford GT. The interior is only slightly altered from the Ford GT, but now has leather upholstery, a machined aluminum instrument cluster, and a McIntosh audio system. The GTR1 uses 20" aluminum wheels, which are fitted with Pirelli P-Zero tires. Carbon fiber disc brakes, with six-piston calipers and Reinforced carbon–carbon rotors are used to stop the car.
