= Superplastic forming =

Superplastic forming is an industrial process used to create precise and complex components out of superplastic materials.

== Process ==
The material is first heated up to promote superplasticity. For titanium alloys e.g. Ti 6Al 4V and some stainless steels this is around 900 °C (1,650 °F) and for aluminium alloys e.g. AA5083 it is between 450 and 520 °C. In this state the material becomes soft so processes that are usually used on plastics can be applied, such as: thermoforming, blow forming, and vacuum forming. Inert gas pressure is applied on the superplastic sheet forcing it into a female die. A release agent, such as ZYP Coatings JK-41, is also commonly used on molds to facilitate release from the die. This allows the process to have high precision.

== Advantages and disadvantages ==
The major advantage of this process is that it can form large and complex workpieces in one operation. The finished product has excellent precision and a fine surface finish. It also does not suffer from springback or residual stresses. Products can also be made larger to eliminate assemblies or reduce weight, which is critical in aerospace applications. Lower strength required and less tooling costs. McDonnell Douglas utilized SPF design and production technology into the F-15 in the 1980s, while in Europe an example of application can be found in some Eurofighter Typhoon assemblies (e.g. engine bays panels, foreplanes, slats).

The largest disadvantage of the process is its slow forming rate. Cycle times vary from two minutes to two hours, therefore it is usually used in low volume production applications. Another disadvantage is the non-uniformity of the produced part thickness. Several methods are used to improve the thickness uniformity of SPF parts. One is to apply a designed varying gas pressure profile instead of a constant pressure. Another approach is to tailor the contact friction between the die surface and the superplastic sheet.

== See also ==
- Hot metal gas forming
- Superplastic forming and diffusion bonding
