= Superplasticity =

State in materials science

In materials science, superplasticity is a state in which solid crystalline material is deformed well beyond its usual breaking point, usually over about 400% during tensile deformation. Such a state is usually achieved at high homologous temperature. Examples of superplastic materials are some fine-grained metals and ceramics. Other non-crystalline materials (amorphous) such as silica glass ("molten glass") and polymers also deform similarly, but are not called superplastic, because they are not crystalline; rather, their deformation is often described as Newtonian fluid. Superplastically deformed material gets thinner in a very uniform manner, rather than forming a "neck" (a local narrowing) that leads to fracture. Also, the formation of microvoids, which is another cause of early fracture, is inhibited. Superplasticity must not be confused with superelasticity.

== Historical developments of superplasticity ==
Some evidence of superplastic-like flow in metals has been found in some artifacts, such as in Wootz steels in ancient India, even though superplasticity was first scientific recognition in the twentieth century in the report on 163% elongation in brass by Bengough in 1912. Later, Jenkins' higher elongation of 300% in Cd–Zn and Pb–Sn alloys in 1928. However, those works did not go further to set a new phenomenon of mechanical properties of materials. Until the work of Pearson was published in 1934, a significant elongation of 1950% was found in Pb–Sn eutectic alloy. It was easy to become the most extensive elongation report in scientific investigation at this time. There was no further interest in superplasticity in the Western World for more than 25 years after Pearson's effort. Later, Bochvar and Sviderskaya continued superplasticity in the Soviet Union with many publications on Zn–Al alloys. A research institute focused on superplasticity, the Institute of Metals Superplasticity Problems, was established in 1985 in Ufa City, Russia. This institute has remained the only global institute to work exclusively to research in superplasticity. The interest in superplasticity rose in 1982 when the first major international conference on 'Superplasticity in Structural Materials, edited by Paton and Hamilton, was held in San Diego. From there, numerous investigations have been published with considerable results. Superplasticity is now the background for superplastic deformation forming as an essential aerospace application technique.

== Conditions ==
In metals and ceramics, requirements for it being superplastic include a fine grain size (less than approximately 10 micrometers) and an operating temperature that is often from above a half absolute melting point. Several studies have found superplasticity in coarse-grain materials. However, the scientific community has agreed the grain size threshold at 10 micrometers is the precondition for activating superplasticity. Generally, grain growth occurs at high-temperature, therefore maintaining the fine grain size structure at homologous temperature, is the main challenge in superplasticity research. The typical microstructure strategy uses a fine dispersion of thermally stable particles, which pin the grain boundaries and maintain the fine grain structure at the high temperatures and existence of multiple phases required for superplastic deformation. The alloy's most typical microstructure for superplasticity is eutectic or eutectoid structure, as found in Sn-Pb, or Zn-Alloy alloys. Those materials that meet these parameters must still have a strain rate sensitivity (a measurement of the way the stress on a material reacts to changes in strain rate) of >0.3 to be considered superplastic. The ideal strain rate sensitivity is 0.5, typically found in micro duplex alloys.

== Mechanism ==
The mechanisms of superplasticity in metals are determined as the Grain Boundary Sliding (GBS). However, the grain boundary sliding (GBS) can lead to the stress concentration at the triple junction or the grain boundary of the hard phases. Therefore, the GBS in polycrystal structured materials must be accompanied by other accommodation processes such as diffusion or dislocation. The diffusion models proposed by Ashby and Verall explain a gradual change in grain shapes to maintain the compatibility between the grains during the deformation. The changes in grain shape are operated by diffusion. The grain boundary migrates to form an equiaxed shape with a new orientation compared to the original grains. The dislocation model is explained as the stress concentration by GBS will be relaxed by dislocation motion in the blocking grains. The dislocation piles up, and the climb would allow another dislocation to be emitted. The further detail in dislocation model is still under debate, with several proposed by Crossman and Ashby, Langdon, and Gifkins model.

== High strain Rate Superplasticity ==
In general, superplasticity often occurs at a slow strain rate, in order of 10^{−4} s^{−1}, and can be energy-consuming. In addition, prolonged time exposed to high-operation temperature also degraded the mechanical properties of materials. There is a strong demand to increase the strain rate in superplastic deformation to the order of 10^{−2} s^{−1}, called High strain Rate Superplasticity (HSRS). Increment of strain rate in superplastic deformation is generally achieved by reduction of grain size in the ultrafine range from 100 to less than 500 ums. Further grain refinement to nanocrystalline structure with grain size less than 100 nm is ineffective in raising the deformation rate or improving ductility. The most common grain refinement process for HSRS research uses Severe Plastic Deformation (SPD). SPD can fabricate exceptional grain refinement to the sub-micrometer or even the nanometer range. Among many SPD techniques, the two most widely used techniques are equal-channel angular pressing (ECAP) and high-pressure torsion (HPT). Besides producing the ultrafine grain size, these techniques also provide a high fraction of high-angle boundaries. These high-angle grain boundaries are a specific benefit to increase the strain rates of deformation. Of the importance of grain refinement processing to superplasticity research, ECAP and HPT have been devoted to mainstream positions in superplasticity studies in metals.

== Advantages of superplastic forming ==
The process offers a range of important benefits, from both the design and production aspects. To begin with there is the ability to form components with double curvature and smooth contours from single sheet in one operation, with exceptional dimensional accuracy and surface finish, and none of the "spring back" associated with cold forming techniques. Because only single surface tools are employed, lead times are short and prototyping is both rapid and easy, because a range of sheet alloy thicknesses can be tested on the same tool.

== Forming techniques ==
There are three forming techniques currently in use to exploit these advantages. The method chosen depends upon design and performance criteria such as size, shape, and alloy characteristics.

=== Cavity forming ===
A graphite-coated blank is put into a heated hydraulic press. Air pressure is then used to force the sheet into close contact with the mould. At the beginning, the blank is brought into contact with the die cavity, hindering the forming process by the blank/die interface friction. Thus, the contact areas divide the single bulge into a number of bulges, which are undergoing a free bulging process. The procedure allows the production of parts with relatively exact outer contours. This forming process is suitable for the manufacturing of parts with smooth, convex surfaces.

=== Bubble forming ===
A graphite coated blank is clamped over a 'tray' containing a heated male mould. Air pressure forces the metal into close contact with the mould. The difference between this and the female forming process is that the mould is, as stated, male and the metal is forced over the protruding form. For the female forming the mould is female and the metal is forced into the cavity. The tooling consists of two pressure Chambers and a counter punch, which is linearly displaceable. Similar to the cavity forming technology, at the process beginning, the firmly clamped blank is bulged by gas pressure.

The second phase of the process involves the material being formed over the punch surface by applying a pressure against the previous forming direction. Due to a better material use, which is caused by process conditions, blanks with a smaller initial thickness compared to cavity forming can be used. Thus, the bubble forming technology is particularly suitable for parts with high forming depths.

=== Diaphragm forming ===
A graphite coated blank is placed into a heated press. Air pressure is used to force the metal into a bubble shape before the male mold is pushed into the underside of the bubble to make an initial impression. Air pressure is then used from the other direction to final form the metal around the male mould. This process has long cycle times because the superplastic strain rates are low. Product also suffers from poor creep performance due to the small grain sizes and there can be cavitation porosity in some alloys. Surface texture is generally good however. With dedicated tooling, dies and machines are costly. The main advantage of the process is that it can be used to produce large complex components in one operation. This can be useful for keeping the mass down and avoiding the need for assembly work, a particular advantage for aerospace products. For example, the diaphragm-forming method (DFM) can be used to reduce the tensile flow stress generated in a specific alloy matrix composite during deformation.

== Aluminium and aluminium based alloys ==
Superplastically formed (SPF) aluminium alloys have the ability to be stretched to several times their original size without failure when heated to between 470 and 520 °C. These dilute alloys containing zirconium, later known by the trade name SUPRAL, were heavily cold worked to sheet and dynamically crystallized to a fine stable grain size, typically 4–5 μm, during the initial stages of hot deformation. Also superplastic forming is a net-shape processing technology that dramatically decreases fabrication and assembly costs by reducing the number of parts and the assembly requirements. Using SPF technology, it was anticipated that a 50% manufacturing cost reduction can be achieved for many aircraft assemblies, such as the nose cone and nose barrel assemblies. Other spin-offs include weight reduction, elimination of thousands of fasteners, elimination of complex featuring and a significant reduction in the number of parts. The breakthrough for superplastic Al-Cu alloys was made by Stowell, Watts and Grimes in 1969 when the first of several dilute aluminium alloys (Al-6% Cu-0.5%Zr) was rendered superplastic with the introduction of relatively high levels of zirconium in solution using specialized casting techniques and subsequent electrical treatment to create extremely fine ZrAl_{3} precipitates.

=== Commercial alloys ===
Some commercial alloys have been thermo-mechanically processed to develop superplasticity. The main effort has been on the Al 7000 series alloys, Al-Li alloys, Al-based metal-matrix composites, and mechanically alloyed materials.

=== Aluminium alloy composites ===
Aluminium alloy and its composites have wide applications in automotive industries. At room temperature, composites usually have higher strength compared to its component alloy. At high temperature, aluminium alloy reinforced by particles or whiskers such as SiO_{2}, Si_{3}N_{4}, and SiC can have tensile elongation more than 700%. The composites are often fabricated by powder metallurgy to ensure fine grain sizes and the good dispersion of reinforcements. The grain size that allows the optimal superplastic deformation to happen is usually 0.5~1 μm, less than the requirement of conventional superplasticity. Just like other superplastic materials, the strain rate sensitivity m is larger than 0.3, indicating good resistance against local necking phenomenon. A few aluminium alloy composites such as 6061 series and 2024 series have shown high strain rate superplasticity, which happens in a much higher strain rate regime than other superplastic materials. This property makes aluminium alloy composites potentially suitable for superplastic forming because the whole process can be done in a short time, saving time and energy.

==== Deformation mechanism for aluminium alloy composites ====
The most common deformation mechanism in aluminium alloy composites is grain boundary sliding (GBS), which is often accompanied by atom/dislocation diffusion to accommodate deformation. The GBS mechanism model predicts a strain rate sensitivity of 0.3, which agrees with most of the superplastic aluminium alloy composites. Grain boundary sliding requires the rotation or migration of very fine grains at relatively high temperature. Therefore, the refinement of grain size and the prevention of grain growth at high temperature is of importance.

The very high temperature (close to melting point) is also said to be related to another mechanism, interfacial sliding, because at high temperatures, partial liquids appear in the matrix. The viscosity of the liquid plays the main role to accommodate the sliding of adjacent grain boundaries. The cavitation and stress concentration caused by the addition of second phase reinforcements are inhibited by the flow of liquid phase. However, too much liquid leads to voids thus deteriorating the stability of the materials. So temperature close to but not exceeding too much the initial melting point is often the optimal temperature. The partial melting could lead to the formation of filaments at the fracture surface, which can be observed under scanning electron microscope. The morphology and chemistry of reinforcements also have influence on the superplasticity of some composites. But no single criterion has yet been proposed to predict their influences.

==== Methods to improve superplasticity ====
A few ways have been suggested to optimize the superplastic deformation of aluminium alloy composites, which are also indicative for other materials:

1. Good dispersion of reinforcements. This is also important for room-temperature performance.
2. Refine the grain size of the matrix. The refinement creates more grains that can slide over each other at high temperature, facilitating the grain boundary sliding mechanism. This also implies a higher optimal strain rate. The trend of increase in strain rate has been observed in materials of finer grain sizes. Severe plastic deformation like equal-channel angular pressing has been reported to be able to achieve ultra-fine grained materials.
3. Appropriately choosing the temperature and the strain rate. Some composites have to be heated close to melting, which might have opposite effects on other composites.

== Titanium and titanium based alloys ==
In the aerospace industry, Titanium alloys such as Ti–6Al–4V find extensive use in aerospace applications, not only because of their specific high temperature strength, but also because a large number of these alloys exhibit superplastic behavior. Superplastic sheet thermoforming has been identified as a standard processing route for the production of complex shapes, especially and are amenable to superplastic forming (SPF). However, in these alloys the additions of vanadium make them considerably expensive and so, there is a need for developing superplastic titanium alloys with cheaper alloying additions. The Ti-Al-Mn alloy could be such a candidate material. This alloy shows significant post-uniform deformation at ambient and near-ambient temperatures.

=== Ti-Al-Mn (OT4-1) alloy ===
Ti-Al-Mn (OT4-1) alloy is currently being used for aero engine components as well as other aerospace applications by forming through a conventional route that is typically cost, labour and equipment intensive. The Ti-Al-Mn alloy is a candidate material for aerospace applications. However, there is virtually little or no information available on its superplastic forming behaviour. In this study, the high temperature superplastic bulge forming of the alloy was studied and the superplastic forming capabilities are demonstrated.

=== The bulging process ===
The gas pressure bulging of metal sheets has become an important forming method. As the bulging process progresses, significant thinning in the sheet material becomes obvious. Many studies were made to obtain the dome height with respect to the forming time useful to the process designer for the selection of initial blank thickness as well as non-uniform thinning in the dome after forming.

=== Case study ===
The Ti-Al-Mn (OT4-1) alloy was available in the form of a 1 mm thick cold-rolled sheet. The chemical composition of the alloy. A 35-ton hydraulic press was used for the superplastic bulge forming of a hemisphere. A die set-up was fabricated and assembled with the piping system enabling not only the inert gas flushing of the die- assembly prior to forming, but also for the forming of components under reverse pressure, if needed. The schematic diagram of the superplastic forming set-up used for bulge forming with all necessary attachments and the photograph of the top (left) and bottom (right) die for SPF.

A circular sheet (blank) of 118 mm diameter was cut from the alloy sheet and the cut surfaces polished to remove burrs. The blank was placed on the die and the top chamber brought in contact. The furnace was switched on to the set temperature. Once the set temperature was reached the top chamber was brought down further to effect the required blank holder pressure. About 10 minutes were allowed for thermal equilibration. The argon gas cylinder was opened to the set pressure gradually. Simultaneously, the linear variable differential transformer (LVDT), fitted at the bottom of the die, was set for recording the sheet bulge. Once the LVDT reached 45 mm (radius of bottom die), gas pressure was stopped and the furnace switched off. The formed components were taken out when the temperature of the die set had dropped to 600 °C. Easy removal of the component was possible at this stage. Superplastic bulge forming of hemispheres were carried out at temperatures of 1098, 1123, 1148, 1173, 1198 and 1223 K (825, 850, 875, 900, 925 and 950 °C) at forming pressures of 0.2, 0.4, 0.6 and 0.87 MPa. As the bulge forming process progresses, significant thinning in the sheet material becomes obvious. An ultrasonic technique was used to measure the thickness distribution on the profile of the formed component. The components were analyzed in terms of the thickness distribution, thickness strain and thinning factor. Post deformation micro-structural studies were conducted on the formed components in order to analyze the microstructure in terms of grain growth, grain elongation, cavitations, etc.

==== Results and discussions ====
The microstructure of the as-received material with a two-dimensional grain size of 14 μm is shown in Fig. 8. The grain size was determined using the linear intercept method in both the longitudinal and transverse directions of the rolled sheet.

Successful superplastic forming of hemispheres were carried out at temperatures of 1098, 1123, 1148, 1173, 1198 and 1223 K and argon gas forming pressures of 0.2, 0.4, 0.6 and 0.8 MPa. A maximum time limit of 250 minutes was given for the complete forming of the hemispheres. This cut-off time of 250 minutes was given for practical reasons. Fig. 9 shows a photo-graph of the blank (specimen) and a bulge formed component (temperature of 1123 K and a forming gas pressure of 0.6 MPa).

The forming times of successfully formed components at different forming temperatures and pressures. From the travel of the LVDT fitted at the bottom of the die (which measured the bulge height/depth) an estimate of the rate of forming was obtained. It was seen that the rate of forming was rapid initially and decreased gradually for all the temperature and pressure ranges as reported in Table 2. At a particular temperature, the forming time reduced as the forming pressure was increased. Similarly at a given forming pressure, forming time decreased with an increase in temperature.

The thickness of the bulge profile was measured at 7 points including the periphery (base) and pole. These points were selected by taking the line between centre of the hemisphere and base point as reference and offsetting by 15° until the pole point was reached. Hence the points 1, 2, 3, 4 and 5 subtend an angle of 15°, 30°, 45°, 60° and 75° respectively with the base of the hemisphere as shown in Fig. 10. The thickness was measured at each of these points on the bulge profile by using an ultrasonic technique. The thickness values for each of the successfully formed hemispherical components.

Fig. 11 shows the pole thickness of fully formed hemispheres as a function of forming pressure at different temperatures. At a particular temperature the pole thickness reduced as the forming pressure was increased. For all the cases studied the pole thickness lay in the range of about 0.3 to 0.4 mm from the original blank thickness of 1 mm.

The thickness strain $\text{ln}(S/S_0)$, where $S$ is the local thickness and $S_0$ is the initial thickness, was calculated at different locations for all the successfully formed components. For a particular pressure the thickness strain reduced as the forming temperature was increased. Fig. 12 shows the thickness strain, $\text{ln}(S/S_0)$ as a function of position along the dome cross section in case of a component formed at 1123 K at a forming pressure of 0.6 MPa.

The post-formed microstructure revealed that there was no significant change in grain size. Fig. 13 shows the microstructure of the bulge formed component at the base and the pole for a component formed at a temperature of 1148 K and forming pressure of 0.6 MPa. These microstructures show no significant change in grain size.

==== Conclusion ====
The high temperature deformation behaviour and superplastic forming capability of a Ti-Al-Mn alloy was studied. Successful forming of 90 mm diameter hemispheres using the superplastic route were carried out at the temperature range of 1098 to 1223 K and forming pressure range of 0.2 to 0.8 MPa. The following conclusions could be drawn:

1. The forming time decreased steeply when the gas pressure or temperature was increased. The rate of forming was initially high, but reduced progressively with time.
2. At a particular temperature the pole thickness reduced as the forming pressure was increased. For all the cases studied the pole thickness lay in the range of about 0.3 to 0.4 mm from the original blank thickness of 1.0 mm.
3. The thinning factor and thickness strain increased as one moved from the periphery to the pole. The post-formed microstructures show no significant change in grain size.

== Iron and steel ==
Mostly on non-qualified materials, such as austenitic steel of the Fe-Mn-Al alloy, which has some of the specific material parameters closely related to microstructural mechanisms. These parameters are used as indicators of material superplastic potentiality. The material was submitted to hot tensile testing, within a temperature range from 600 °C to 1000 °C and strain-rates varying from 10−6 to 1 s−1. The strain rate sensitivity parameter (m) and observed maximum elongation until rupture (εr) could be determined and also obtained from the hot tensile test.

=== Fe with Mn and Al alloys ===
The experiments stated a possibility of superplastic behaviour in a Fe-Mn-Al alloy within a temperature range from 700 °C to 900 °C with grain size around 3 μm (ASTM grain size 12) and average strain rate sensitivity of m ~ 0.54, as well as a maximum elongation at rupture around 600%.

=== Fe with Al and Ti alloys ===
The superplastic behaviour of Fe-28Al, Fe-28Al-2Ti and Fe-28Al-4Ti alloys has been investigated by tensile testing, optical microscopy and transmission electron microscopy. Tensile tests were performed at 700–900 °C under a strain rate range of about 10^{−5} to 10^{−2}/s. The maximum strain rate sensitivity index m was found to be 0.5 and the largest elongation reached 620%. In Fe3Al and Fe Al alloys with grain sizes of 100 to 600μm exhibit all deformation characteristics of conventional fine grain size superplastic alloys.

However, superplastic behaviour was found in large-grained iron aluminides without the usual requisites for superplasticity of a fine grain size and grain boundary sliding. Metallographic examinations have shown that the average grain size of large-grained iron aluminides decreased during superplastic deformation.

== Ceramics ==
=== The properties of ceramics ===
The properties of ceramic materials, like all materials, are dictated by the types of atoms present, the types of bonding between the atoms, and the way the atoms are packed together. This is known as the atomic scale structure. Most ceramics are made up of two or more elements. This is called a compound. For example, alumina (Al_{2}O_{3}), is a compound made up of aluminium atoms and oxygen atoms.

The atoms in ceramic materials are held together by a chemical bond. The two most common chemical bonds for ceramic materials are covalent and ionic. For metals, the chemical bond is called the metallic bond. The bonding of atoms together is much stronger in covalent and ionic bonding than in metallic. That is why, generally speaking, metals are ductile and ceramics are brittle. Due to ceramic materials wide range of properties, they are used for a multitude of applications. In general, most ceramics are:

- hard
- wear-resistant
- brittle
- refractory
- thermal insulators
- electrical insulator
- nonmagnetic
- oxidation resistant
- prone to thermal shock
- good chemical stability

High-strain-rate superplasticity has been observed in aluminium-based and magnesium-based alloys. But for ceramic materials, superplastic deformation has been restricted to low strain rates for most oxides, and nitrides with the presence of cavities leading to premature failure. Here we show that a composite ceramic material consisting of tetragonal zirconium oxide, magnesium aluminates spinal and alpha-alumina phase exhibit superplasticity at strain rates up to 1.0 s^{−1}. The composite also exhibits a large tensile elongation, exceeding 1050% or a strain rate of 0.4 s^{−1}. Superplastic metals and ceramics have the ability to deform over 100% without fracturing, permitting net-shape forming at high temperatures. These intriguing materials deform primarily by grain boundary sliding, a process accelerated with a fine grain size. However, most ceramics that start with a fine grain size experience rapid grain growth during high temperature deformation, rendering them unsuitable for extended superplastic forming. One can limit grain growth using a minor second phase (Zener pinning) or by making a ceramic with three phases, where grain to grain contact of the same phase is minimized. A research on fine grain three phase alumina-mullite(3Al_{2}O_{3}·2SiO_{2})-zirconia, with approximately equal volume fractions of the three phases, demonstrates that superplastic strain rates as high as 10^{−2}/sec at 1500 °C can be reached. These high strain rates put ceramic superplastic forming into the realm of commercial feasibility.

=== Cavitations ===
Superplastic forming will only work if cavitations don't occur during grain boundary sliding, those cavitations leaving either diffusion accommodation or dislocation generation as mechanisms for accommodating grain boundary sliding. The applied stresses during ceramic superplastic forming are moderate, usually 20–50 MPa, usually not high enough to generate dislocations in single crystals, so that should rule out dislocation accommodation. Some unusual and unique features of these three phase superplastic ceramics will be revealed, however, indicating that superplastic ceramics may have a lot more in common with metals than previously thought.

=== Yttria-stabilized tetragonal zirconia polycrystalline ===
Yttrium oxide is used as the stabilizer. This material is predominantly tetragonal in structure. Y-TZP has the highest flexural strength of all the zirconia based materials. The fine grain size of Y-TZP lends itself to be used in cutting tools where a very sharp edge can be achieved and maintained due to its high wear resistance. It is considered to be the first true polycrystalline ceramic shown to be superplastic with a 3-mol % Y-TZP (3Y-TZP), which is now considered to be the model ceramic system. The fine grade size leads to a very dense, non-porous ceramic with excellent mechanical strength, corrosion resistance, impact toughness, thermal shock resistance and very low thermal conductivity. Due to its characteristics Y-TZP is used in wear parts, cutting tools and thermal barrier coatings.

=== Grain size ===
Superplastic properties of 3Y-TZP is greatly affected by grain size as displaced in Fig. 3, elongation to failure decreases and flow strength increases while grain size increases. A study was made on the dependence of flow stress on grain size, the result –in summary- shows that the flow stress approximately depends on the grain size squared:

$$\sigma \propto d^2\,$$

Where:

$\sigma\,$ is the flow stress.
d is the instantaneous grain size.

== Alumina (Al_{2}O_{3}) ==
Alumina is probably one of the most widely used structural ceramics, but superplasticity is difficult to obtain in alumina, as a result of rapid anisotropic grain growth during high-temperature deformation. Regardless of which, several studies have been performed on superplasticity in doped, fine-grain Al_{2}O_{3}.Demonstrated that the grain size of Al_{2}O_{3} containing 500-ppm MgO can be further refined by adding various dopants, such as Cr_{2}O_{3}, Y_{2}O_{3}, and TiO_{2}. A grain size of about 0.66 μm was obtained in a 500-ppm Y_{23}-doped Al_{2}O_{3}. As a result of this fine grain size, the Al_{2}O_{3} exhibits a rupture elongation of 65% at 1450 °C under an applied stress of 20 MPa.

== See also ==
- Superplastic forming
- High-explosive anti-tank

== Bibliography ==
- Agarwal, Sumit (2006). Evaluation and Prediction of Material Response During Superplastic Forming at Various Strain Rates (Ph.D. thesis). Brown University. OCLC 549697889.
- . Superplasticity:Dr R H Johnson Metallurgical Review No 146 Sept 1970. Institute of Metals London, UK
