= Four-slide =

Metalworking tool

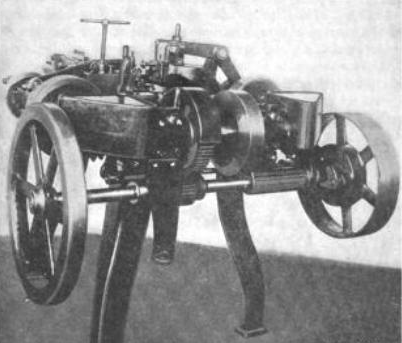
A four-slide machine

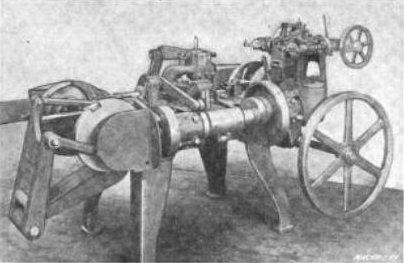
The same four-slide machine from another angle

A four-slide, also known as a multislide, multi-slide, or four-way, is a metalworking machine tool used in the high-volume manufacture of small stamped components from bar or wire stock. The press is most simply described as a horizontal stamping press that uses cams to control tools. The machine is used for progressive or transfer stamping operations.

== Design ==
A four-slide is quite different from most other presses. The key of the machine is its moving slides that have tools attached, which strike the workpiece together or in sequence to form it. These slides are driven by four shafts that outline the machine. The shafts are connected by bevel gears so that one shaft is driven by an electric motor, and then that shaft's motion drives the other three shafts. Each shaft then has cams which drive the slides, usually of a split-type. This shafting arrangement allows the workpiece to be worked for four sides, which makes this machine extremely versatile. A hole near the center of the machine is provided to expel the completed workpiece.

== Advantages and disadvantages ==
The greatest advantage of the four-slide machine is its ability to complete all of the operations required to form the workpiece from start to finish. Moreover, it can handle certain parts that transfer or progressive dies cannot, because it can manipulate from four axes. Due to this flexibility it reduces the cost of the finished part because it requires less machines, setups, and handling. Also, because only one machine is required, less space is required for any given workpiece. As compared to standard stamping presses the tooling is usually inexpensive, due to the simplicity of the tools. A four-slide can usually produce 20,000 to 70,000 finished parts per 16-hour shift, depending on the number of operations per part; this speed usually results in a lower cost per part.

The biggest disadvantage is its size constraints. The largest machines can handle stock up to 3 in (76 mm) wide, 12.5 in (320 mm) long, and 3/32 in (2.4 mm) thick. For wires the limit is 1/8 in (3.175 mm). Other limits are the travel on the slides, which maxes out at 3/4 in (19.05 mm), and the throw of the forming cams, which is between 7/8 and 2 in (22 and 51 mm). The machine is also limited to only shearing and bending operations. Extrusion and upsetting operations are impractical because it hinders the movement of the workpiece to the next station. Drawing and stretching require too much tonnage and the mechanisms required for the operations are space prohibitive. Finally, this machine is only feasible to use on high volume parts because of the long lead time required to set up the tooling.

== Materials ==
The material stock used in four-slides is usually limited by its formability and not the machine capabilities. Usually the forming characteristics and bending radii are the most limiting factors. The most commonly used materials are:

- Low-carbon cold rolled steel
- Spheroidized cold rolled spring steel
- Type 300 and 400 stainless spring steels
- Copper alloys
- Beryllium-copper alloys

== Use ==
Items that are commonly produced on this machine include: automotive stampings, hinges, links, clips, and razor blades.
