= Cold working =

Any metal shaping process which occurs below its recrystallization temperature

In metallurgy, cold forming or cold working is any metalworking process in which metal is shaped below its recrystallization temperature, usually at the ambient temperature at or near room temperature. Such processes are contrasted with hot working techniques like hot rolling, forging, welding, etc. The same or similar terms are used in glassmaking for the equivalents; for example cut glass is made by "cold work", cutting or grinding a formed object.

Cold forming techniques are usually classified into four major groups: squeezing, bending, drawing, and shearing. They generally have the advantage of being simpler to carry out than hot working techniques.

Unlike hot working, cold working causes the crystal grains and inclusions to distort following the flow of the metal; which may cause work hardening and anisotropic material properties. Work hardening makes the metal harder, stiffer, and stronger, but less plastic, and may cause cracks of the piece.

The possible uses of cold forming are extremely varied, including large flat sheets, complex folded shapes, metal tubes, screw heads and threads, riveted joints, and much more.

== Processes ==
The following is a list of cold forming processes:

Squeezing: Burnishing • Coining • Extrusion • Forging (specifically cold-forging)• Heading • Hubbing • Peening • Riveting • Rolling • Sizing • Staking • Swaging • Thread rolling

Bending: Angle bending • Draw and compression • Flanging • Roll bending • Roll forming • Seaming • Straightening

Shearing: Blanking • Cutoff • Dinking • Piercing • Lancing • Nibbling • Notching • Perforating • Shaving • Sheet metal shear-cutting • Slitting • Trimming

Drawing: Embossing • Ironing • Metal spinning • Sheet metal drawing • Stretch forming • Tube drawing • Wire drawing • Superplastic forming

== Advantages ==
Advantages of cold working over hot working include:

- No heating required
- Better surface finish
- Superior dimensional control
- Better reproducibility and interchangeability
- Directional properties can be imparted into the metal
- Contamination problems are minimized

Depending on the material and extent of deformation, the increase in strength due to work-hardening may be comparable to that of heat treating. Therefore, it is sometimes more economical to cold-work a less costly and weaker metal than to hot-work a more expensive metal that can be heat treated, especially if precision or a fine surface finish is required as well.

The cold-working process also reduces waste as compared to machining, or even eliminates with near-net-shape methods. The material savings becomes even more significant at larger volumes, and even more so when using expensive materials, such as copper, nickel, gold, tantalum, and palladium. The saving on raw material as a result of cold forming can be very significant, as is saving machining time. Production cycle times when cold working are very short. On multi-station machinery, production cycle times are even less. This can be very advantageous for large production runs.

== Disadvantages ==
Some disadvantages and problems of cold working are:

- The metal is harder, calling for greater forces, harder tools and dies, and heavier equipment
- The metal is less ductile and malleable, limiting the amount of deformation that can be obtained
- Metal surfaces must be clean and scale-free
- May leave undesirable anisotropy in the final piece
- May leave undesirable residual stress in the final piece

The need for heavier equipment and harder tools may make cold working suitable only for large-volume manufacturing.

The loss of plasticity due to work hardening may require intermediate annealings, and a final annealing to relieve residual stress and give the desired properties to the manufactured object. These extra steps would negate some of the economic advantages of cold forming over hot forming.

Cold-worked items suffer from a phenomenon known as springback, or elastic springback. After the deforming force is removed from the workpiece, the workpiece springs back slightly. The amount a material springs back is equal to the yield strain (the strain at the yield point) for the material. In more complex cases, springback can be estimated by using finite-element elastoplastic analysis and neural-network predictions, in the sense of a Reduced Order Model based on Artificial Intelligence (ROM-AI).

Special precautions may be needed to maintain the general shape of the workpiece during cold working, such as shot peening and equal channel angular extrusion.
