= Metalworking hand tool =

Handheld tools used to manipulate metal

Metalworking hand tools are hand tools used in the metalworking field.

== Types ==
=== Dollies ===
Dollies can be handheld, or mounted on a stake or post. Metal dollies come in a variety of sizes and shapes and are used for all types of hand-forming, planishing (smoothing), and shrinking.

=== Files and rasps ===
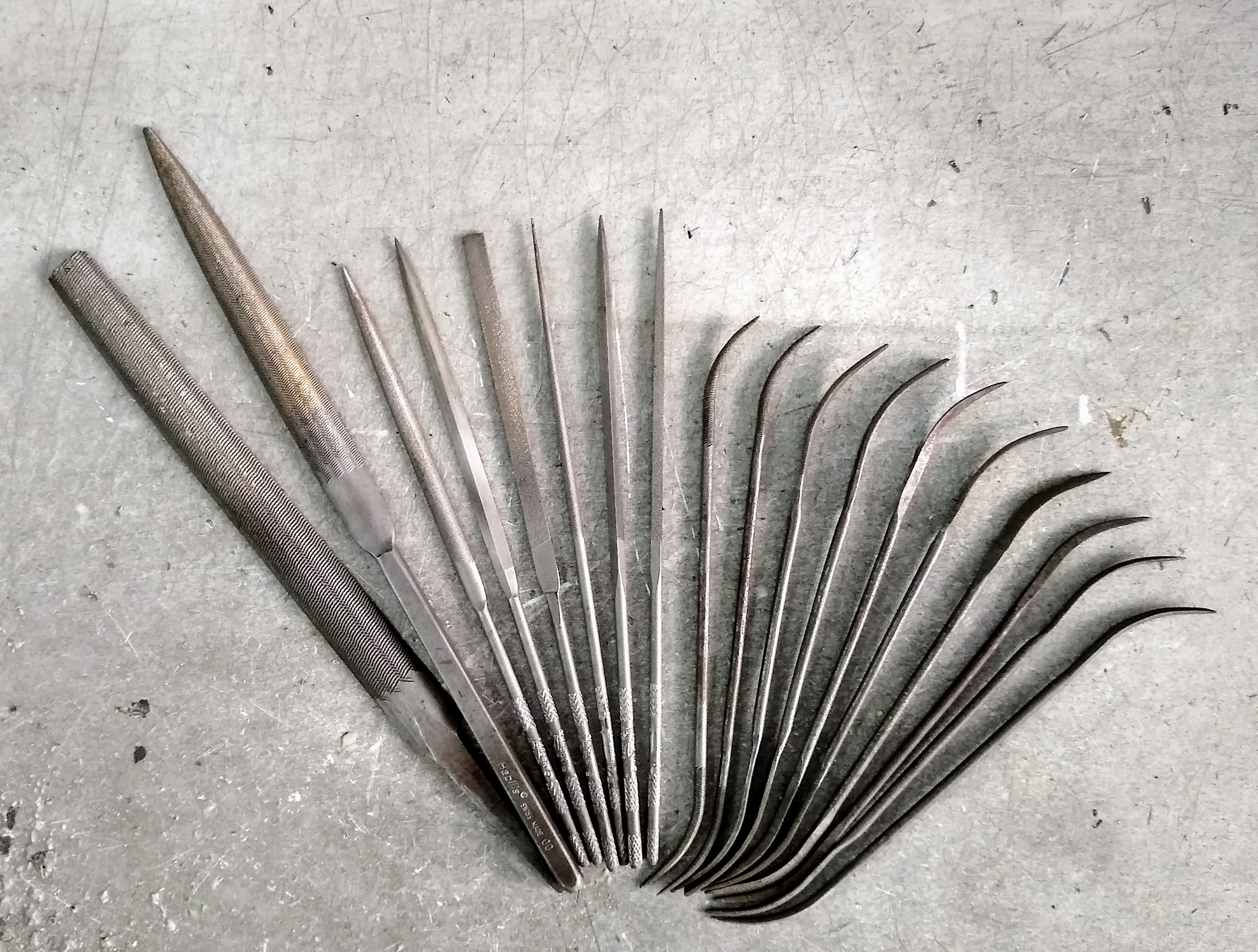
Various hand files used in jewellery making

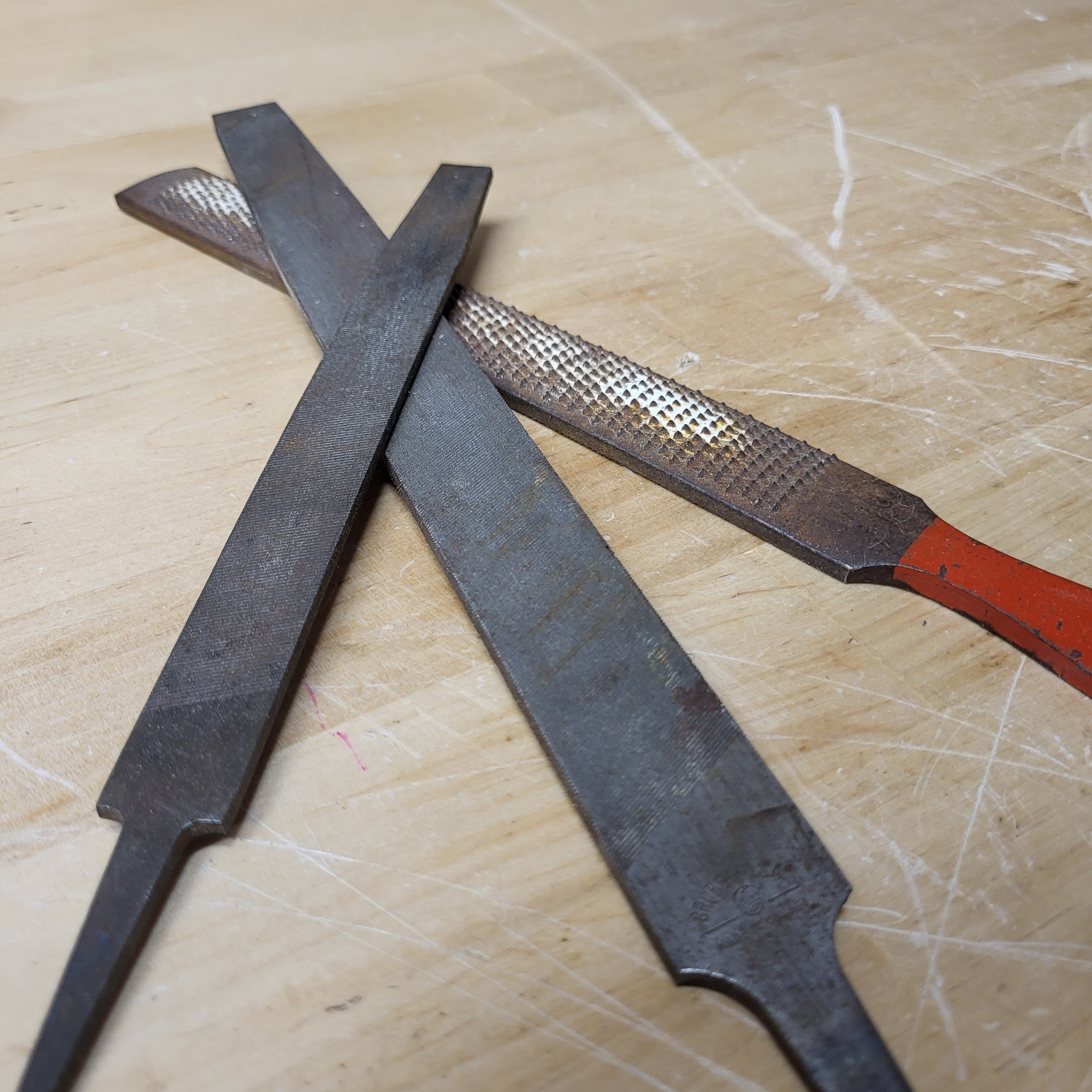
Two files (left) and a rasp (right)

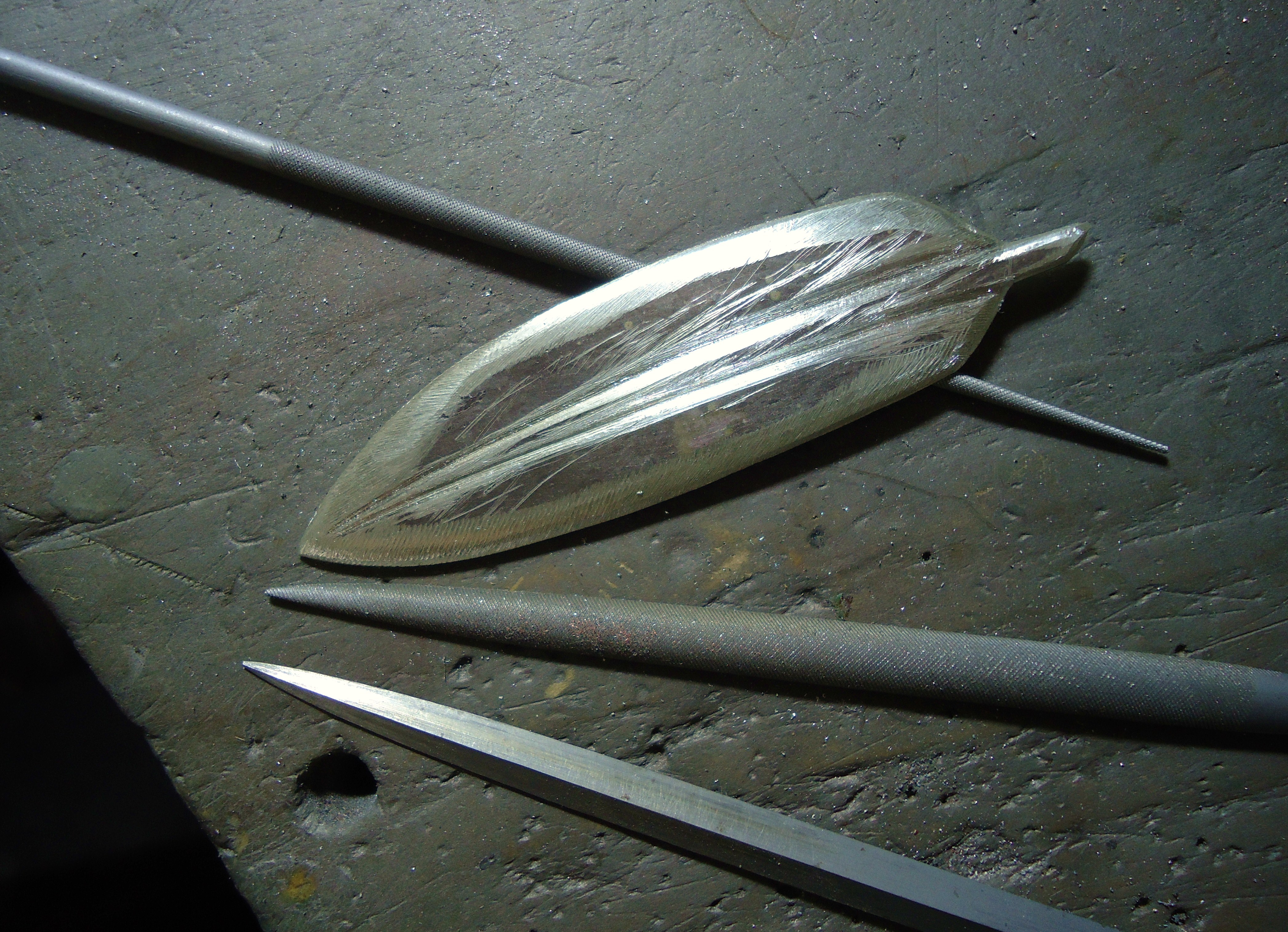
The files and rasps pictured were used to finish the shiny portions of this silver letter opener.

Files and rasps are used to provide a smooth finish for detail work, and are often used in the aerospace industry.

=== Forming bags ===
Forming bags, also known as soft dollies, are usually filled with sand or lead, shot and sewn very tightly out of a top-grade canvas or leather. When used correctly, a forming bag allows the user to "shrink" the metal without marking it.

=== Hammers ===
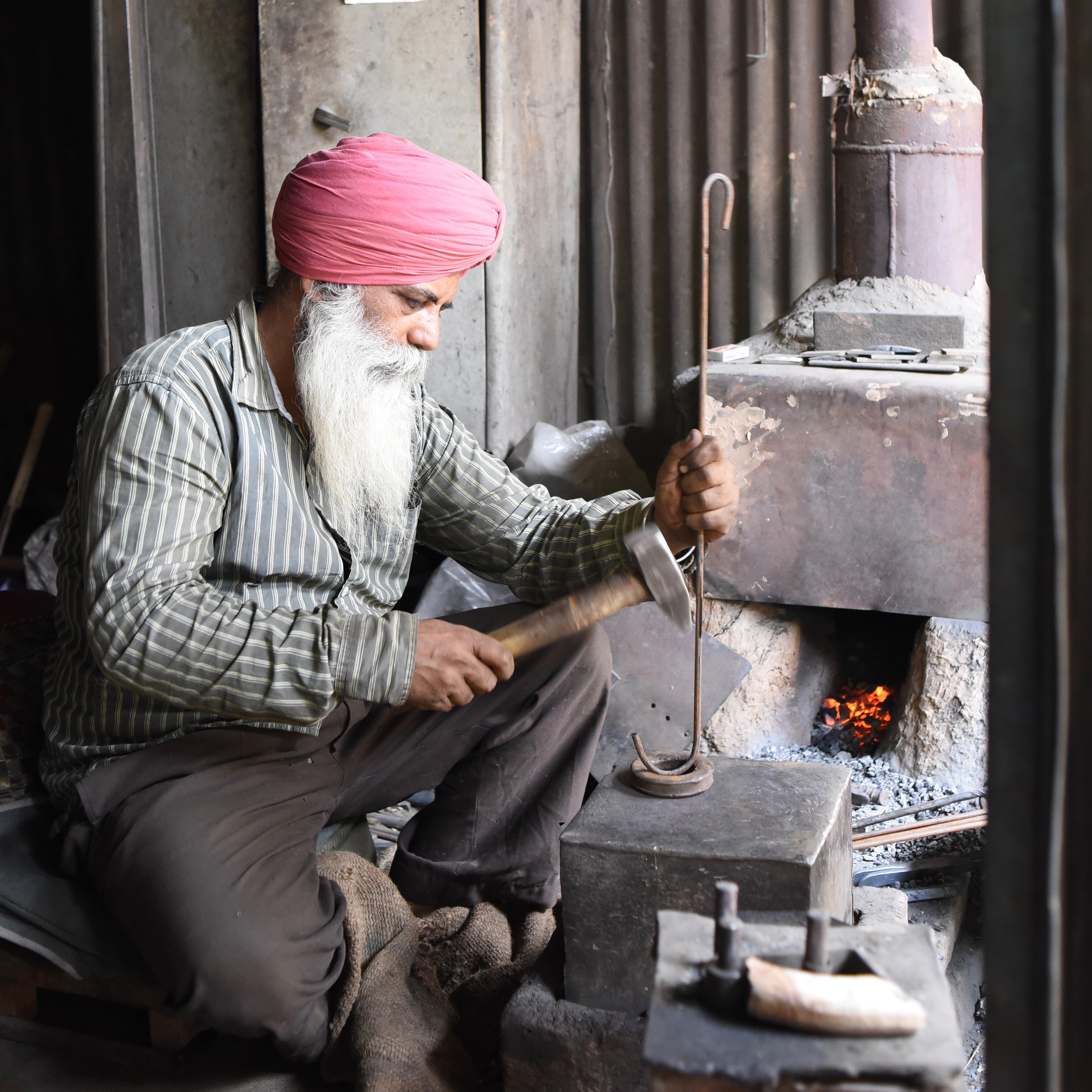
Blacksmith using a hammer to curve an iron rod in Punjab, India

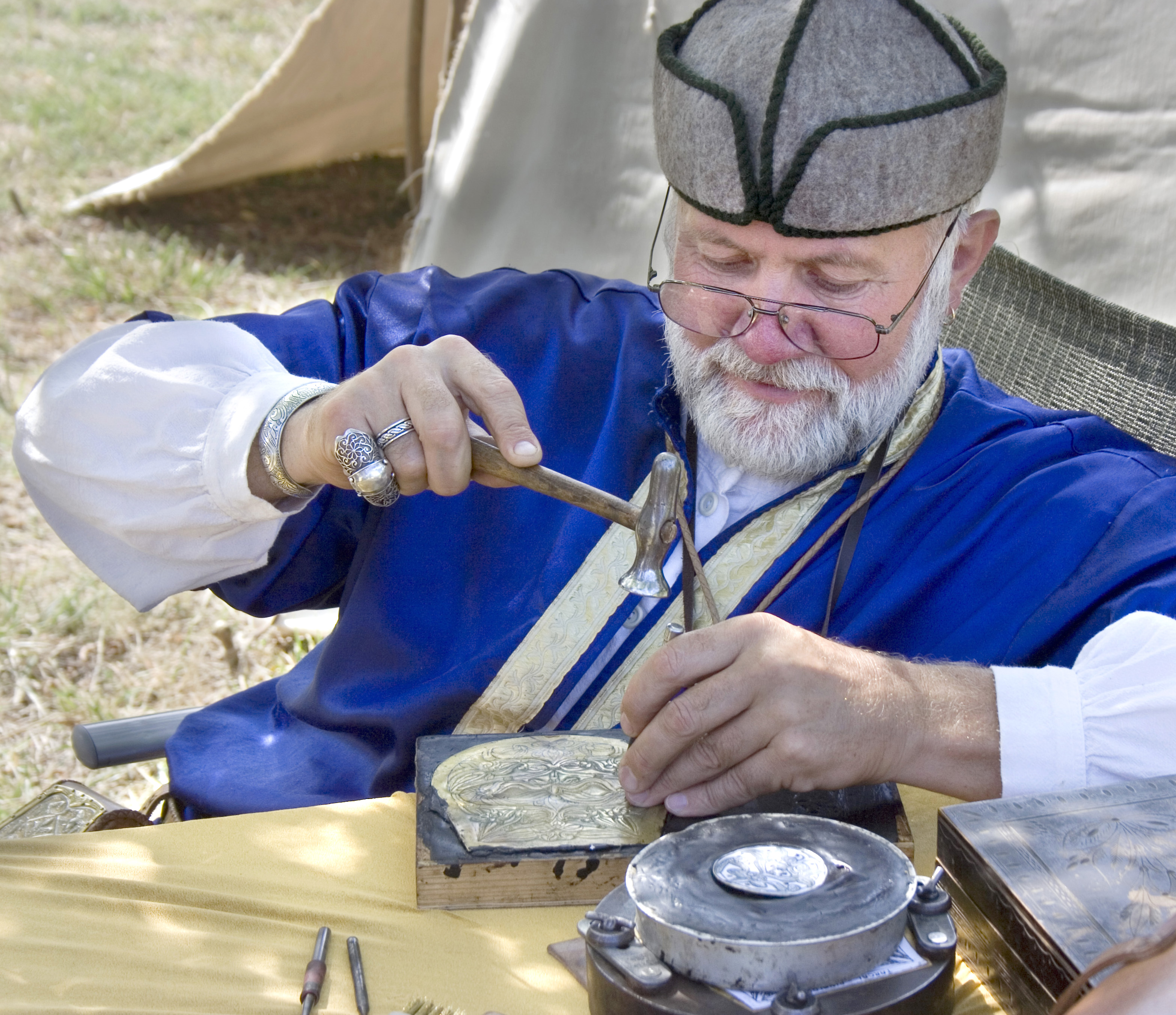
Traditional Hungarian coppersmith using a small hammer and chisel to engrave elaborate designs onto a copper plate

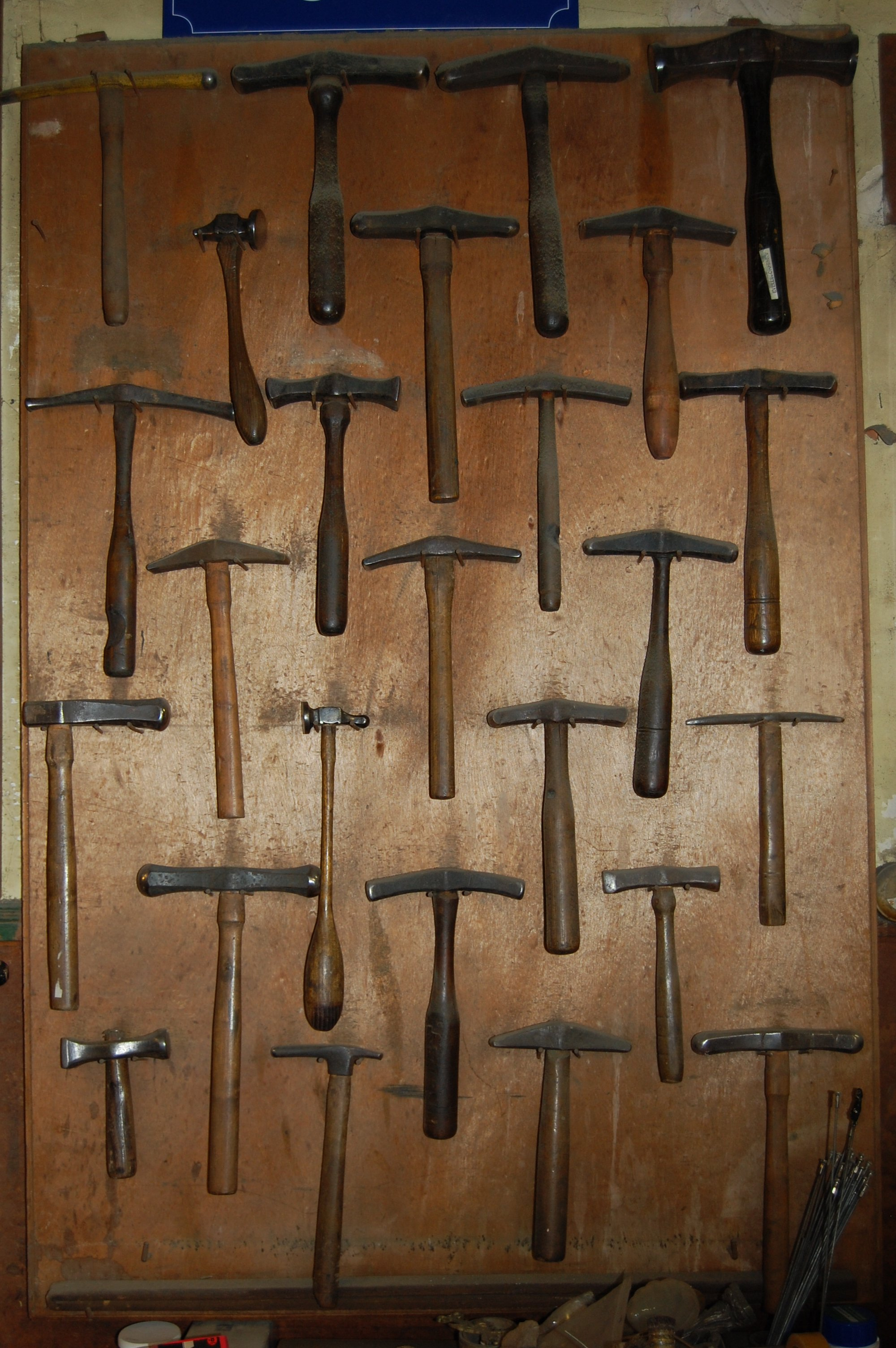
Various silversmithing hammers

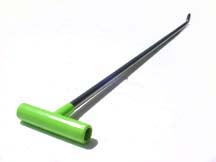
Hammer used for paintless dent removal

A wide range of body hammers are used in metalworking. Hammers range from small, lightweight "pick" hammers (which provide stubby pick point and high-crown peen-type faces that will ding out small dents in high fins), to specialty hammers and heavy-duty "bumping" hammers for heavy gauge truck fenders and panels. There are dozens of hammers that are designed for specific tasks or metal thicknesses.

Most hammers have one flat end that can be used to hit a chisel when engraving metal. Thus, most hammers can be used for metalworking, even hammers such as the claw hammer which are not commonly used in metalworking.

The ball-peen hammer is most commonly used for metalworking. The rounded peen can be used to stretch and shape metal, and to repair metal sheets, with less risk of tearing compared to hammers with sharper peens.

In the automotive industry, there are specialty hammers for paintless dent repair. Slide hammers are used to pull dents in tight areas that cannot be accessed from the outside. Panel beating hammers are common and come in many different shapes.

=== Mallets ===
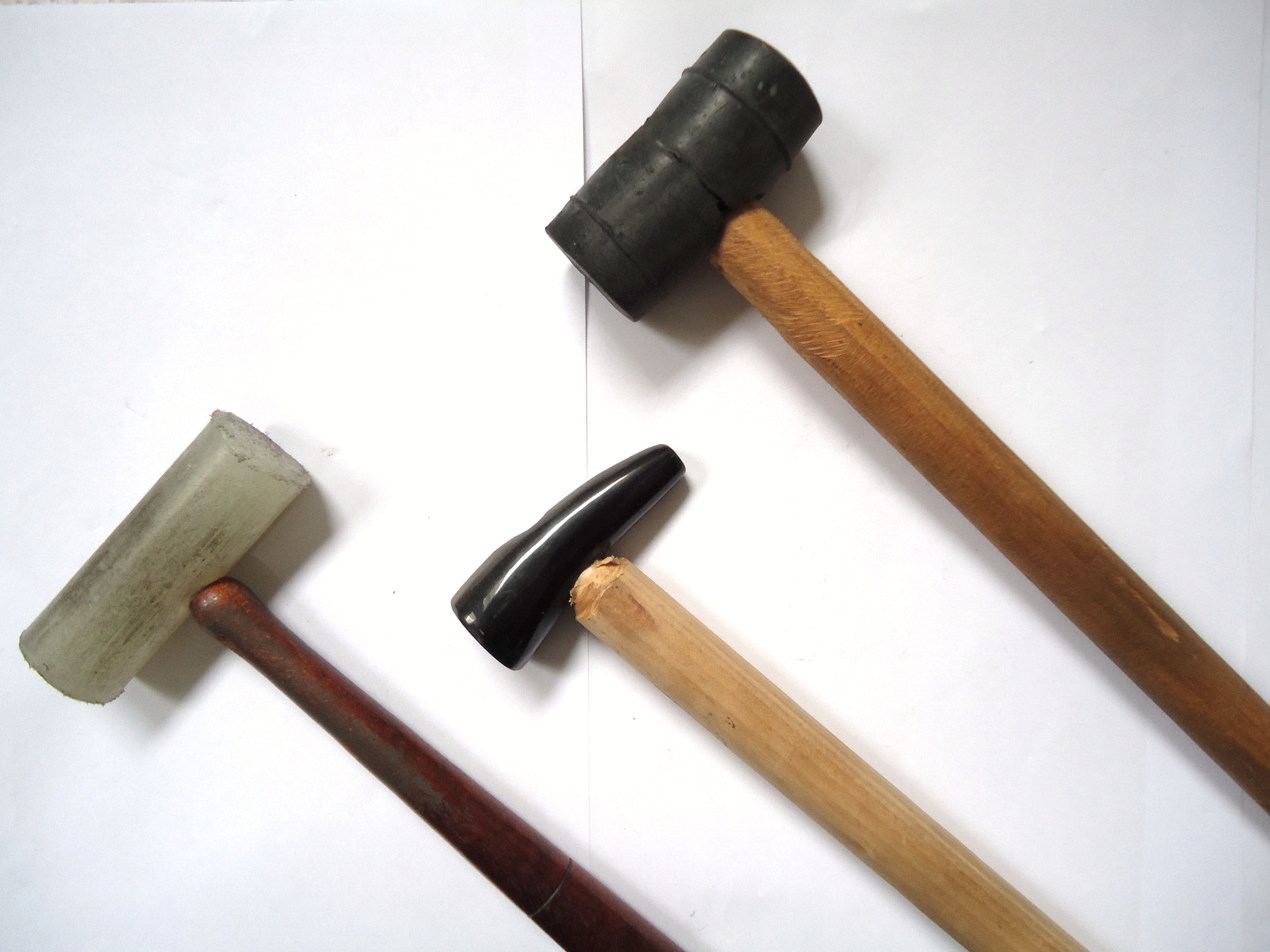
Soft mallets for jewellery making, made of nylon (left), horn (middle), and rubber (right)

The faces of mallets used for metalworking are generally made of a material that is softer than the metal being worked; common materials used include brass, plastic (such as nylon), rawhide, rubber, and wood. These faces come in a variety of shapes, such as flat, torpedo, hemispheric, or square. The different faces–and material the mallet is made of–allow the user to work and/or shrink different metals. For example, the flat face can be used for planishing and smoothing and for hand shrinking thicker soft metals. The striking weight of a large hickory wood "torpedo mallet" is most suitable for shaping soft metals such as aluminum or copper, whereas a similar torpedo mallet made from heavy black rubber has a striking weight which is best used for shaping steel.

Heavier soft mallets can be difficult to control due to blowback. To solve this, some metalworkers use dead-blow mallets to increase striking weight without decreasing precision.

=== Marking and layout tools ===
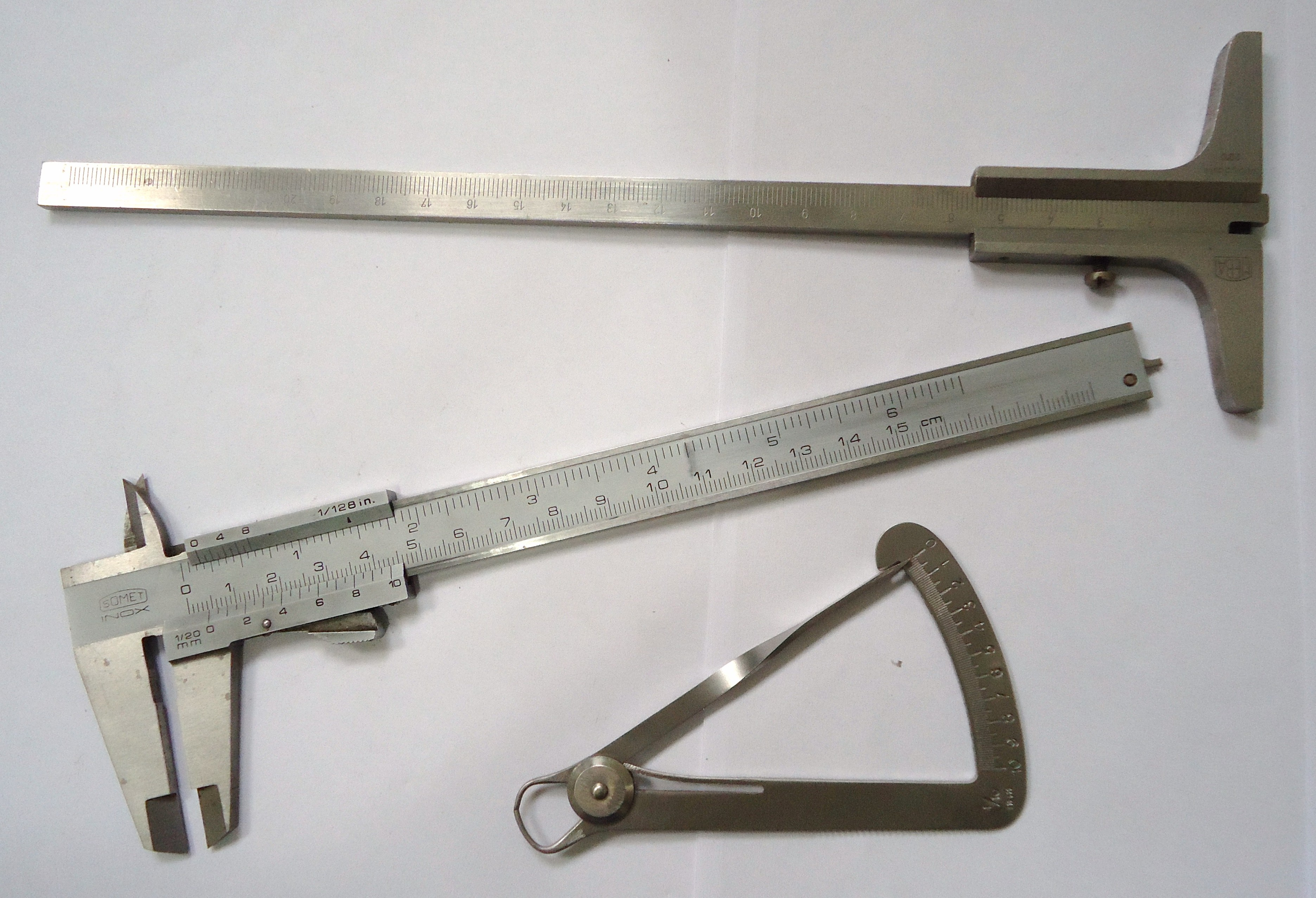
Three types of calipers used in jewellery making: depth caliper (top), Vernier caliper (middle), and proportional caliper (bottom)

Marking and layout tools are essential to metalwork.

Various calipers are used to measure metal sheets, wires, gemstones, and other elements used in a particular piece. Manual calipers often include sliding jaws, which the user first adjusts to fit the length being measured, then measures it with a ruler.

Vernier calipers have a built-in ruler for quicker measurement.

Oddleg calipers are used to scribe a line at a set distance from the edge of a workpiece.

A profile gauge is frequently used by metalworkers to copy curves.

=== Pliers ===
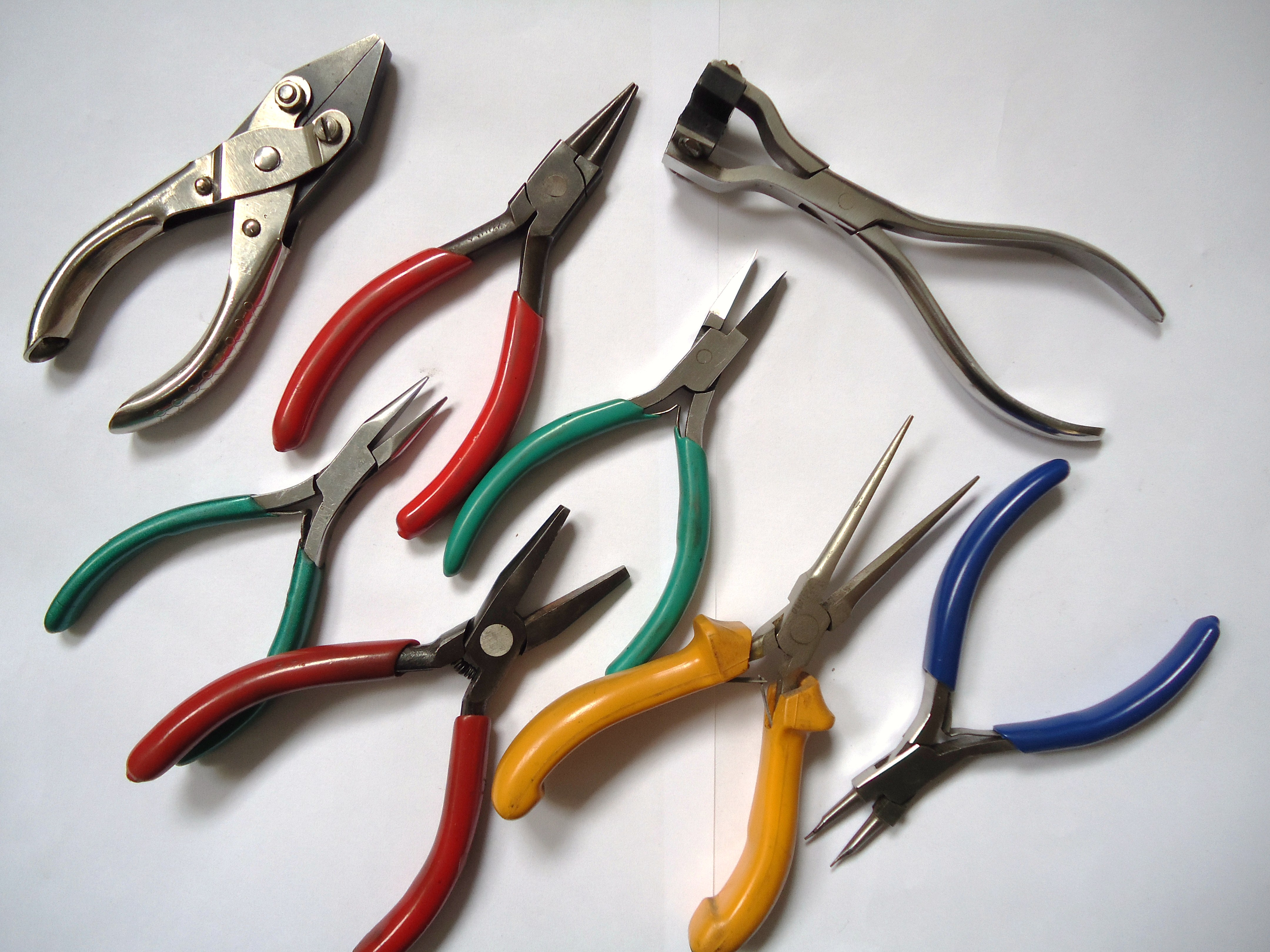
Various jewellery making pliers

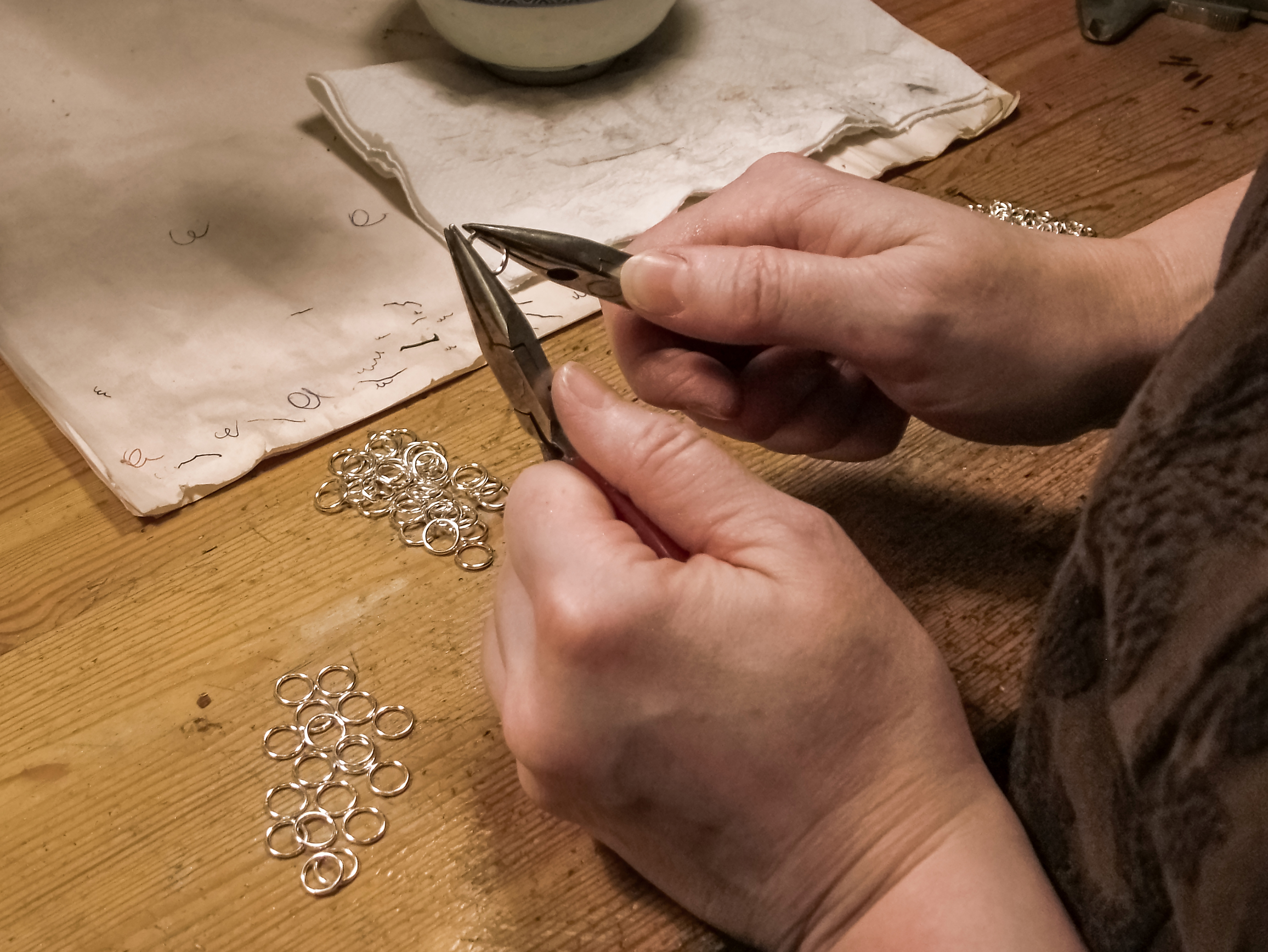
Using two sets of pliers to close a chain link

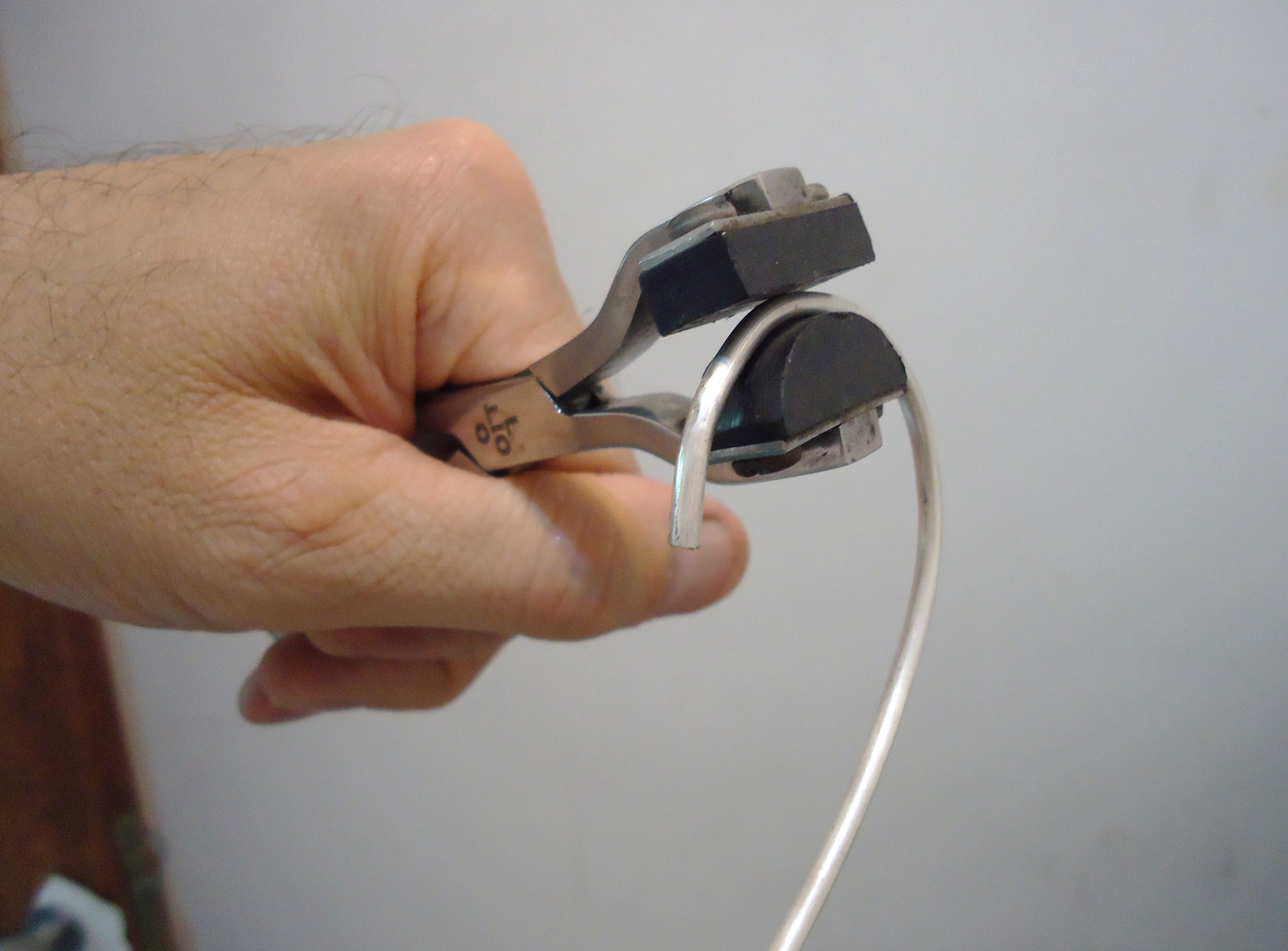
Using bending pliers to curve a silver wire

A wide variety of pliers are used in metalworking, especially in jewelry making, which often requires manipulation of wire and small pieces of metal.

Specialized pliers used in metalworking include bending pliers, bent nose pliers, crimpers, cutting pliers, forging pliers, lineman's pliers, locking pliers, needle-nose pliers, parallel pliers, and wire strippers.

=== Slappers ===
Slappers can be used to shrink, contour, and planish (smooth) a panel without leaving rough marks. The slapper controls more surface with each blow than a hammer can, and is easy to use because it has the same angle of attack as a body hammer. This means the user does not need to change their arm and hand position when moving from hammer to slapper. The slapper can be far more effective than the hammer for shrinking metal, because its leverage gives greater mechanical advantage over the rough spots. The slapper is great for working metal over a T-stake, or for gouging and planishing. A good slapper can make radius bends and crowns quite well. A slapper works well with forming stakes and post dollies for lightly planishing and pulling cold shrinks.

Both wooden and metal slappers can be used for metalworking. Generally, wood slappers are covered with a leather-face.

=== Snips and shears ===
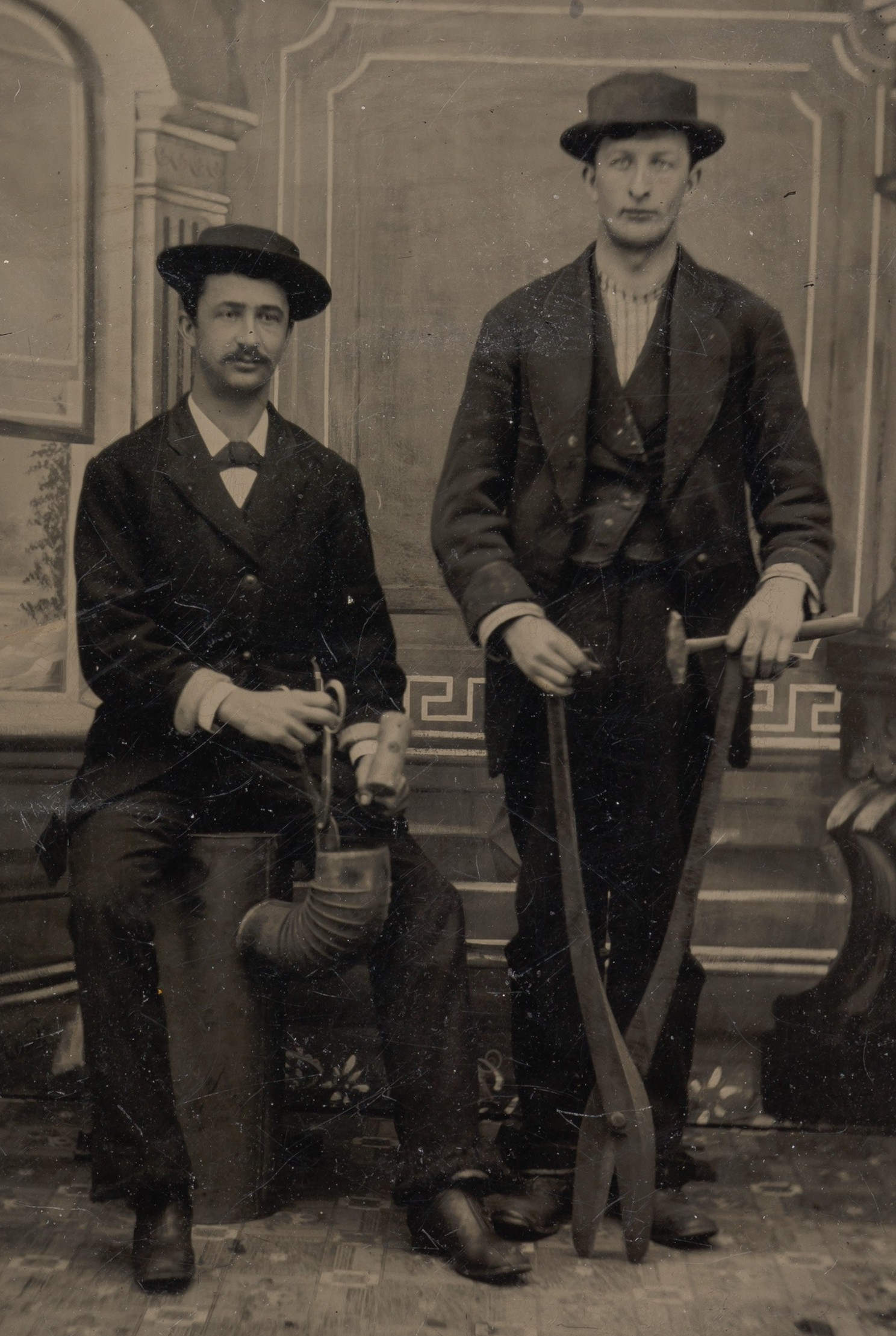
Tinsnips come in many sizes.

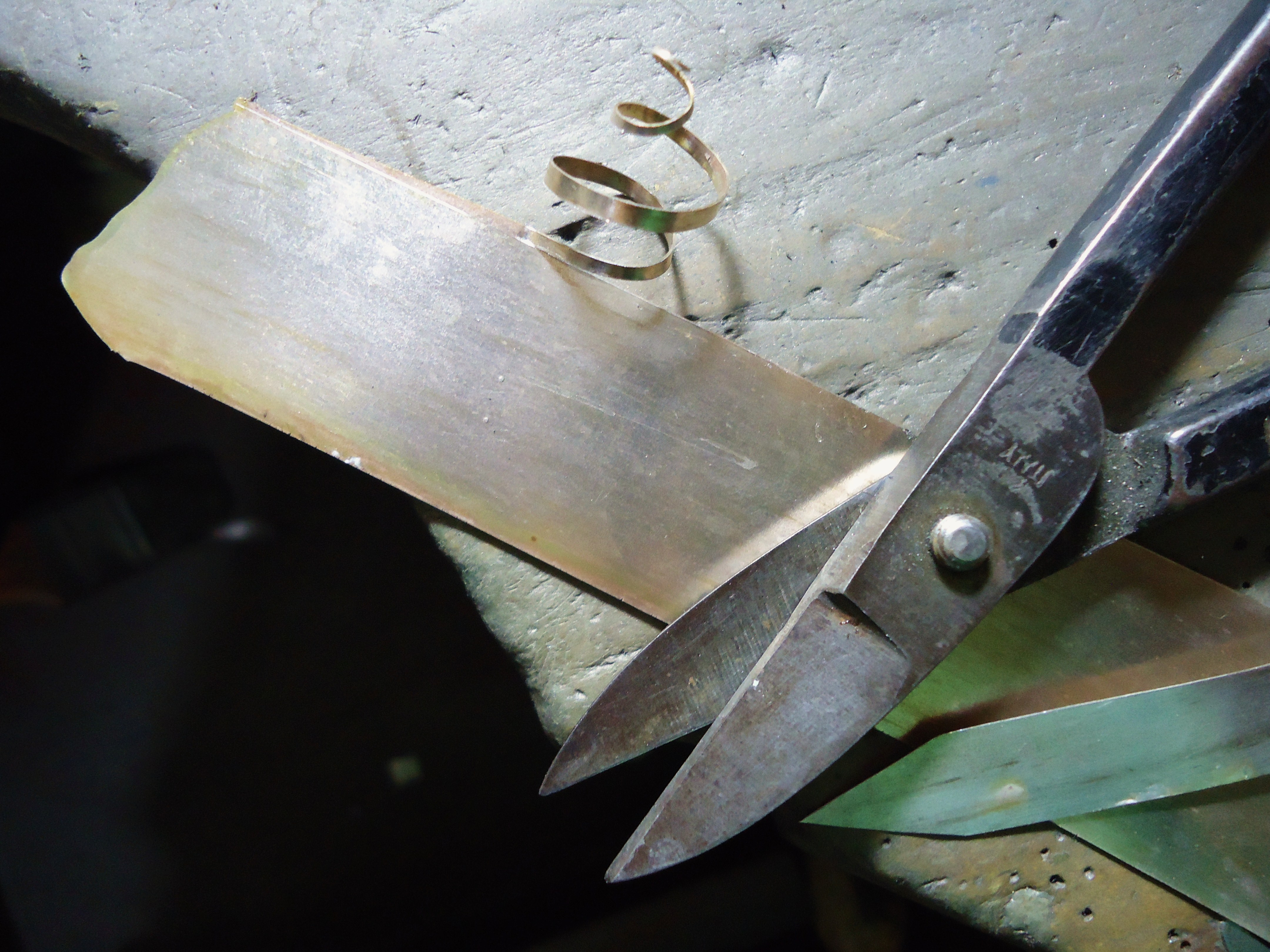
These tinsnips were used to cut this silver sheet.

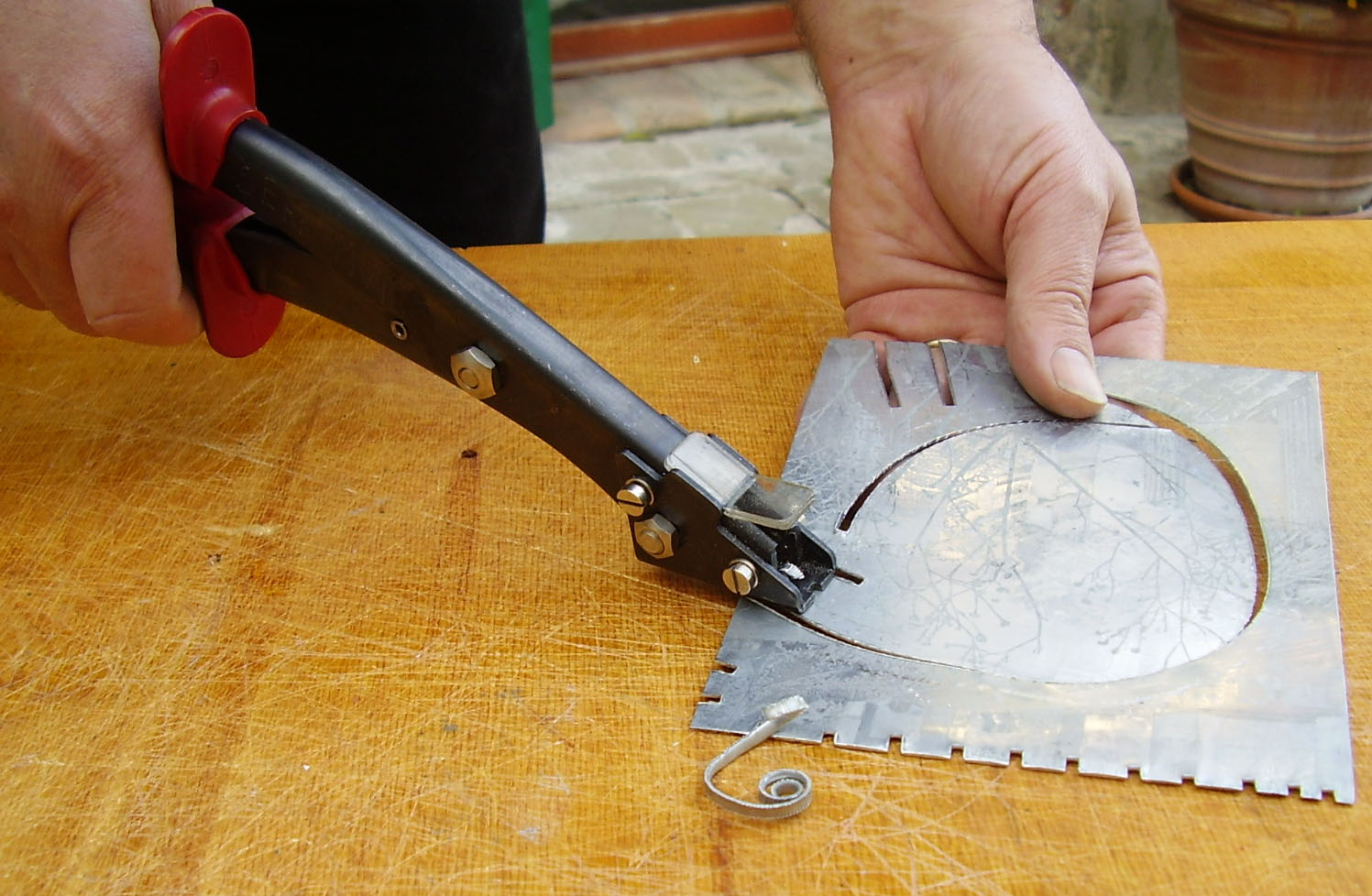
Using a nibbler to cut a metal sheet

Snips and shears are used for cutting metal. Various types of snips and shears are used for different metals and thicknesses. Some styles of shears allow longer or shorter cuts. Certain types of snips and shears are recommended for aviation metalworking.

=== Spoons ===
Spring steel spoons are a type of finishing tool with a variety of uses. They are fairly durable, and can be used in combination with other tools, such as dollies or spikes, to provide an accurate contoured surface.

One way to use metalworking spoons is to place them against the metal to be worked, then hammer them to create an imprint of the spoon's shape. This method is popular in auto body repairs because it allows the user to shape the metal without marking the paint.

== See also ==
- Knockout punch
- Screw extractor
- Set tool
- Tool and die maker
- Woodworking hand tools
