= Pancake die =

Manufacturing die that performs blanking or piercing

A pancake die is a simple type of manufacturing die that performs blanking or piercing. Many dies perform complex procedures simultaneously (or progressively for progressive die) such as coining, piercing, forming, bending in addition to product removal and transport (for additional manufacturing procedures or packaging). A pancake die may only perform one simple procedure with the finished product being removed by hand.

An example would be a die that performs blanking of .030-inch-thick (0.76 mm) round paper gaskets without holes. This type of die would be created in one simple pass from a wire EDM after heat treating. The workpiece would then produce the punch and the die after the cut is complete. Additional work would then include adding a stripper plate to the punch plate after the punch has been mounted (on punch plate). At this point the pancake die is ready for production.
