= Snips =

Hand tool

Snips, also known as shears, are metalworking hand tools used to cut sheet metal and other tough webs. Workers use various types of snips, with the cutting edges being straight or curved to various degrees. The style of edge employed will depend if a straight sheer or some type of shape cut is necessary. There are two broad categories: tinner's snips, which are similar to common scissors, and compound-action snips, which use a compound leverage handle system to increase the mechanical advantage.

== Types ==
=== Tinner snips ===
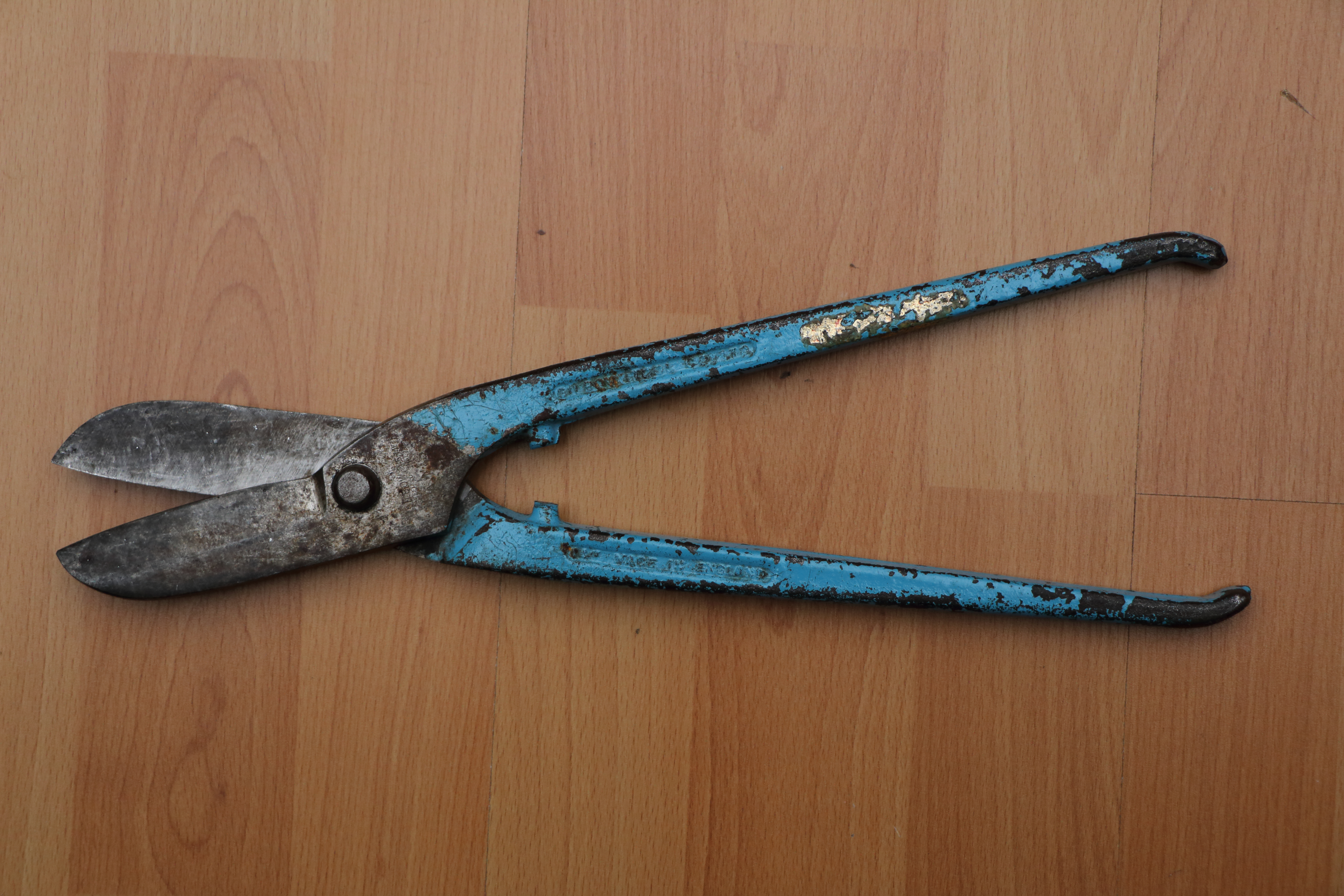
12" Gilbow tin snips. Made in England.

Tinner's snips, also known as tinner snips or tin snips, are one of the most popular type of snips. They are defined by their long handles and short blades. They usually have extra wide jaws and are made of drop forged carbon steel. Depending on the size of the blade, tin snips can cut between 24 gauge (0.64 mm) and 16 gauge (1.59 mm) cold rolled low-carbon tinplate (also called tin). They can be ranged in length from 180 to 360 mm (7 to 14 in) long. There are two main types: straight-pattern and duckbill-pattern. Straight-pattern is best for straight cuts, but can handle gentle curves. Duckbill-pattern snips, also known as trojan-pattern snips, have blades that taper down from the pivot to the tip of the blades. The blade edges are also bevelled to more easily cut curves and circles or shapes. They are a lighter duty snip that can only cut up to 25 gauge (0.56 mm) mild steel.

Other common blade patterns include the circle pattern or curved pattern and the hawk's-bill pattern. Circle pattern snips have a curved blade and are used to cut circles. Hawk's-bill snips are used to cut small radii on the inside and outside of a circle. The shape of the blades allow for sharp turns without buckling the sheet metal. A common use is cutting holes in pipes.

=== Compound-action snips ===
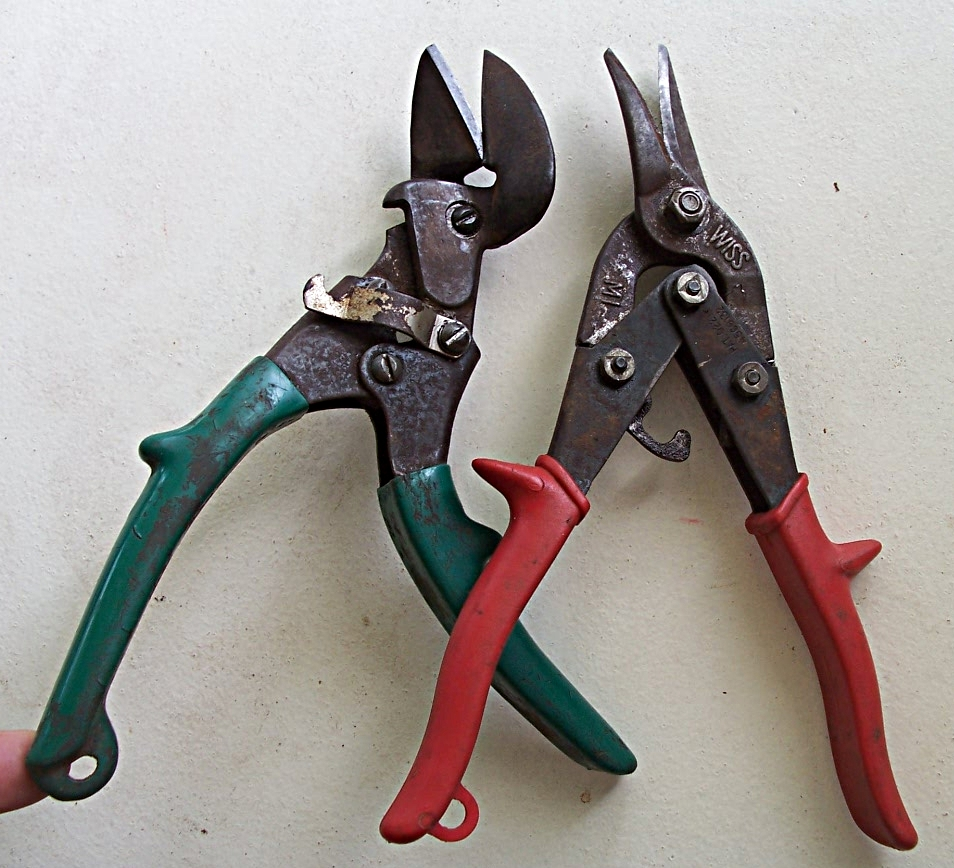
Right cutting and left-cutting compound-action snips, respectively; the green snips on the left are an offset-pattern

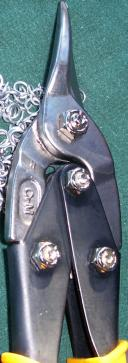
Straight-cutting compound-action snips

Compound-action snips, also known as aviation snips, maille snips or sheet snips, are the most popular type of snips as they are able to exert a higher force compared to other types of snip of the same size, because of the design of their linkage. They were first developed to cut aluminum in the construction of aircraft, hence they are often referred to as aviation snips. They can handle aluminium up to 18 gauge, mild steel up to 24 gauge (0.64 mm) or stainless steel up to 26 gauge (0.48 mm).

There are three cutting styles for compound-action snips: straight cutting, left cutting, and right cutting. Straight cutting snips (generally have yellow colored soft grips) cut in a straight line and wide curves; left cutting snips (usually red) will cut straight and in a tight curve to the left; right cutting snips (usually green) will cut straight and in a tight curve to the right. These different cutting styles are necessary because metal is stiff and heavy and does not move out of the way readily when cutting around a curve. The respective styles move the material out of the way when cutting in the direction they are designed for. The blades are usually serrated to prevent material slippage.

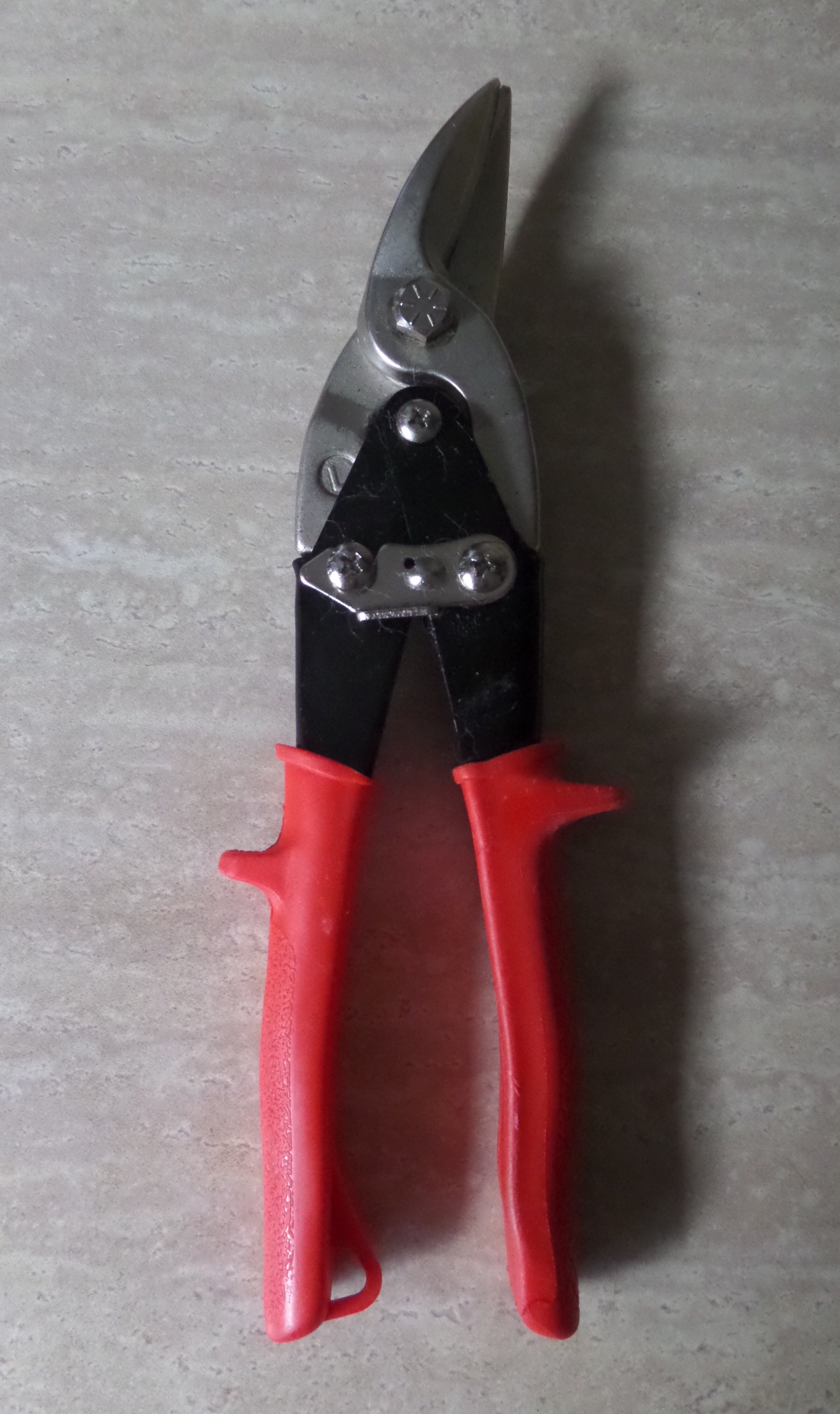
Tin snips

In addition to the configurations outlined below, there are also upright and long cut configurations. The upright snip has the blades rotated 90° from the handles. This configuration is more ergonomic and commonly used in tight spaces. The long cut snip has long blades that make it easier to make long straight cuts. These snips are commonly used on vinyl or aluminium siding.

Standard compound-action snips are designed for cutting steel or softer materials, although the occasional use on stainless steel is not detrimental. For cutting through tougher materials, such as inconel and titanium, special hard snips are available. They are similar in design to standard or offset aviation snips, but have specially heat treated blades. These snips will have a different color handle to differentiate them from the other standard types.

=== Pipe and duct snips ===
Pipe and duct snips, also known as double cut snips, are a subtype of compound-action snip used to cut stove pipe and ducting lengthwise. The snips have a three-piece jaw that has two side blades that slide against a central blade. This creates a 11/64 in (4.4 mm) wide strip that curls up along the cut. A compound lever system is used to increase the mechanical advantage.

=== Configuration ===
The following types of snips are available in different configurations. The first is the angle of the blades to the handles. If the handles are inline with the blades then the combination is known as a straight snips; if the handles are at an angle then it is known as an offset configuration. This design allows for the material to flow away from the blades when making long cuts, which is easier and safer than straight cutting snips.

The bulldog-pattern is a blade pattern that has longer handles to increase the mechanical advantage of the snips. In tinner's snips this means the handles are extra long. The compound-action bulldog-pattern, also known as a notch snips, has the ability to cut up to 16 gauge (1.59 mm) cold rolled sheet metal or multiple layers of sheet metal up to 1.6 mm (0.062 in) thick.

Some snips have replaceable blades for when the blade becomes worn out. An added advantage to this is the ability to make the rest of the snips from a lightweight material, usually aluminum. This helps to reduce fatigue.

== See also ==
- Nibbler
- Shear (sheet metal)
