= Slapper =

Slapper may refer to:

- Slapper detonator
- Slapper, a metalworking hand tool
- Slapper, a character in Transformers: Robots in Disguise
- "Slapper" (Ayye), a 2012 single by Nadia Oh
