= Rasp =

Filing tool

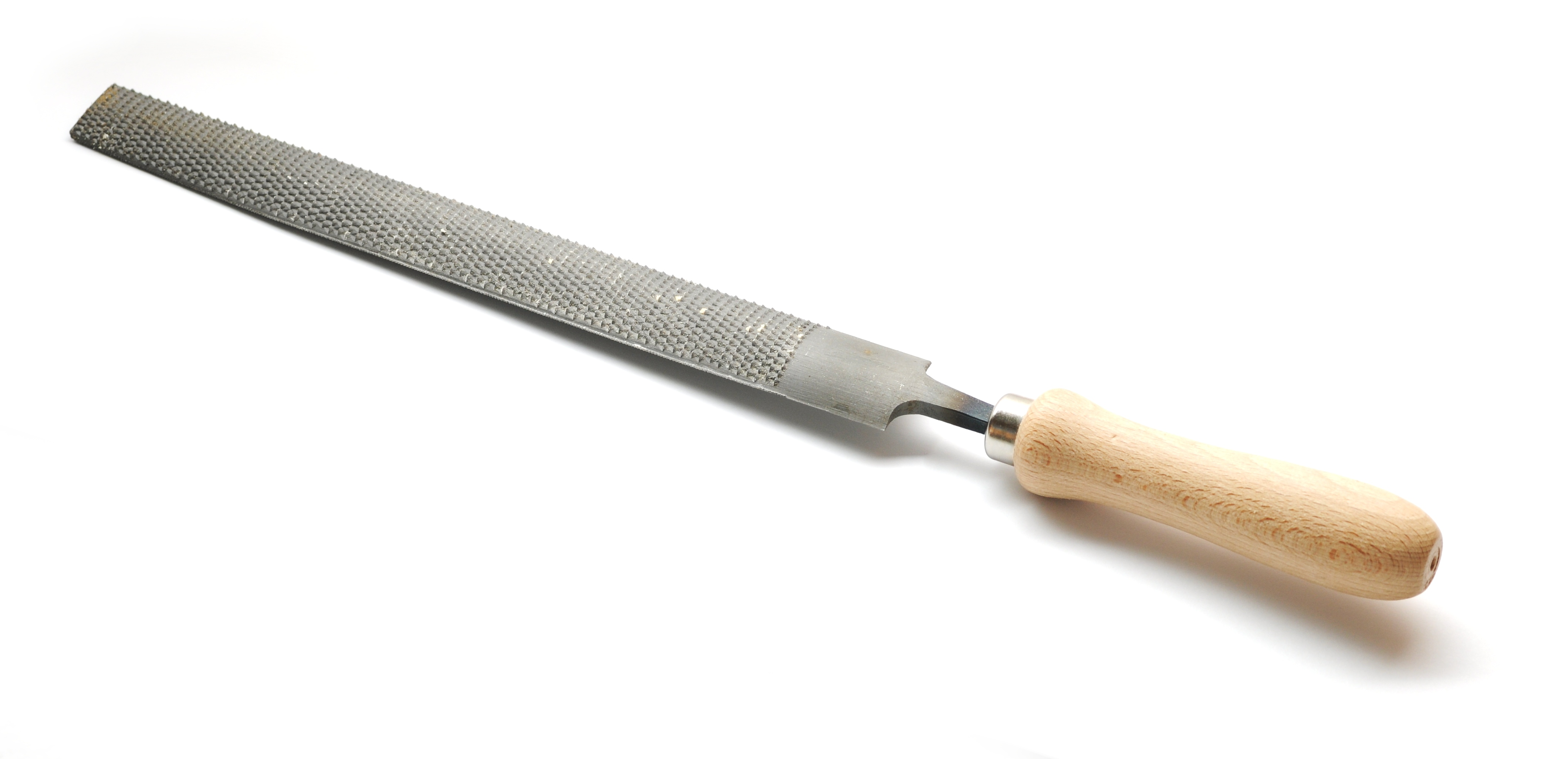
Fine wood rasp

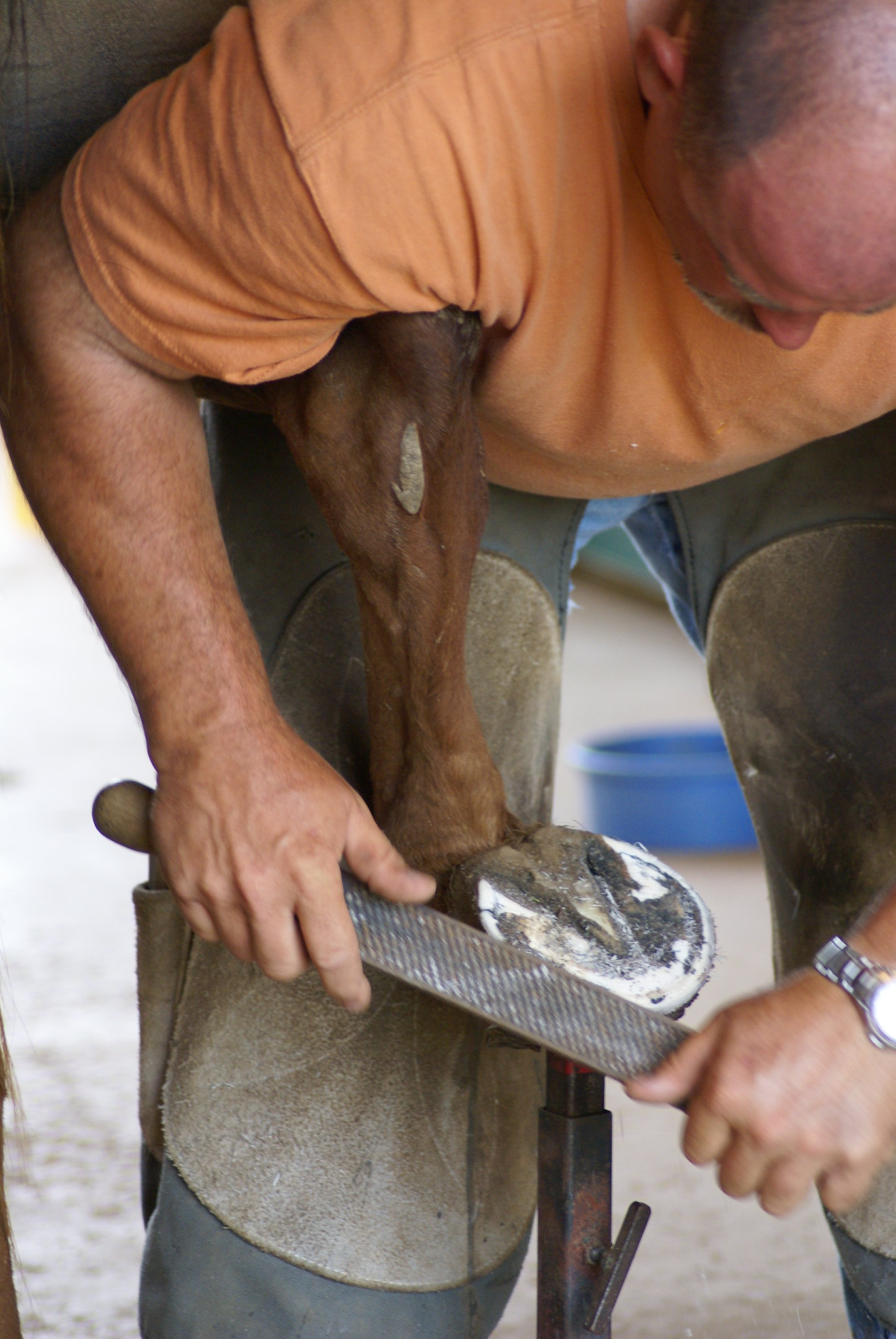
Farrier using a two-sided file, double-cut on the visible side and rasp cut against a horse's hoof

A rasp is a coarse form of file used for shaping wood, metal, or other material. Typically a hand tool, it consists of a generally tapered rectangular, round, or half-round sectioned bar of case hardened steel with distinct, individually cut teeth. A narrow, pointed tang is common at one end, to which a handle may be fitted.

== Uses ==
Rasps come in a variety of shapes—rectangular, round, and half-round—and vary in coarseness, from finest, "cabinet", to most coarse, "wood". Farriers, for example, commonly use rasps to remove excess wall from a horse's hoof. They are also used in woodworking for rapidly removing material and are easier to control than a drawknife. The rough surfaces they leave may be smoothed with finer tools, such as single- or double-cut files.

Rasps are used in shaping alabaster. Saws and chisels are used to rough out alabaster work.

Machine-made rasps have uniformly stamped teeth. They often leave deeper marks as rows of teeth follow each other exactly, and will require a subsequent smoothing step. A hand-cut rasp is still a premium tool for carving work, as the slight variation in tooth spacing avoids this 'tramline' effect and so they are still available, at a price.

== See also ==
- Metalworking hand tool
- Surform
- Woodworking tools
