= Hot shrinking =

Hot shrinking is a process in car bodyworks. As the name suggests, heat will be involved, while "shrinking" is the process of straightening a metal section. This is a method of panel beating where a panel is first heated to make it softer. In most cases, heating will be done by use of the oxyacetylene flame.

== Hot shrinking process ==
Locate the highest point of the panel, light the torch and heat the spot to a cherry red. Strike the area using a mallet around the heat spot. After several blows the sop will turn black, quench it immediately with a damp cloth. Repeat the process around the heated spot until the stretched part becomes fully shrunk.

== See also ==
Cold shrinking - a longer but similar process
