= Stamping (metalworking) =

Forming metal sheets with a stamping press

Animation of a power press with a fixed barrier guard

Stamping is the process of placing flat sheet metal, in either blank or coil form, into a stamping press where a tool and die surface forms the metal into a new shape. Stamping includes a variety of sheet-metal forming manufacturing processes, such as punching using a machine press or stamping press, blanking, embossing, bending, flanging, and coining. This could be a single-stage operation, in which every stroke of the press produces the desired form, or it could occur through a series of stages.

The process is usually carried out on sheet metal but can be used on other materials, such as polystyrene. Progressive dies are commonly fed from coils of steel, coil reel for unwinding of coil to a straightener (also known as removing the coilset, the tendency for material to keep the bend of the coil) and then into a feeder which advances the material into the press and die at a predetermined feed length. Depending on part complexity, the number of stations in the die can be determined.

Stamping is usually done on cold metal sheet. Forging is a similar process using hot metal forming operations.

== History ==
It is believed that the first coins were struck by the Lydians in what is modern-day Turkey in the seventh century B.C. Until 1550, the hammering method of coins remained the primary method of coin-making. Marx Schwab in Germany developed a new process for stamping that involved as many as 12 men turning a large wheel to press metal into coins. In the 1880s, the stamping process was further innovated.

Stamped parts were used for mass-produced bicycles in the 1880s. Stamping replaced die forging and machining, resulting in greatly reduced cost. Although not as strong as die forged parts, they were of good enough quality.

Stamped bicycle parts were being imported from Germany to the United States in 1890. U.S. companies then started to have stamping machines custom built by U.S. machine tool makers. Through research and development, Western Wheel was able to stamp most bicycle parts.

Several automobile manufacturers adopted stamping of parts. Henry Ford resisted the recommendations of his engineers to use stamped parts, but when his company could not satisfy demand with die forged parts, Ford was forced to use stamping.

Over the history of metal stamping, forging and deep drawing, presses of all types are the backbone of metals manufacturing. The processes continue to improve in moving more metal in one press stroke. Press and interconnected automation devices increase production rates, reduce labor costs and provide more safety for workers.

== Operation ==
- Bending – the material is deformed or bent along a straight line.
- Flanging – the material is bent along a curved line.
- Embossing – the material is stretched into a shallow depression. Used primarily for adding decorative patterns. See also Repoussé and chasing.
- Blanking – a piece is cut out of a sheet of the material, usually to make a blank for further processing.
- Coining – a pattern is compressed or squeezed into the material. Traditionally used to make coins.
- Drawing – the surface area of a blank is stretched into an alternate shape via controlled material flow. See also deep drawing.
- Stretching – the surface area of a blank is increased by tension, with no inward movement of the blank edge. Often used to make smooth auto body parts.
- Ironing – the material is squeezed and reduced in thickness along a vertical wall. Used for beverage cans and ammunition cartridge cases.
- Reducing/Necking – used to gradually reduce the diameter of the open end of a vessel or tube.
- Curling – deforming material into a tubular profile. Door hinges are a common example.
- Hemming – folding an edge over onto itself to add thickness. The edges of automobile doors are usually hemmed.

Piercing and cutting can also be performed in stamping presses. Progressive stamping is a combination of the above methods done with a set of dies in a row through which a strip of the material passes one step at a time.

== Lubricant ==
The Tribology process generates friction which requires the use of a lubricant to protect the tool and die surface from scratching or galling. The lubricant also protects the sheet metal and finished part from the same surface abrasion as well as facilitate elastic material flow preventing rips, tears and wrinkles. There are a variety of lubricants available for this task. They include plant and mineral oil-based, animal fat or lard-based, graphite-based, soap and acrylic-based dry films. The newest technology in the industry is polymer-based synthetic lubricants also known as oil-free lubricants or non-oil lubricants. The term "Water-Based" lubricant refers to the larger category that also includes more traditional oil and fat-based compounds.

== Simulation ==
Sheet metal forming simulation is a technology that calculates the process of sheet metal stamping, predicting common defects such as splits, wrinkles, springback and material thinning. Also known as forming simulation, the technology is a specific application of non-linear finite element analysis. The technology has many benefits in the manufacturing industry, especially the automotive industry, where lead time to market, cost and lean manufacturing are critical to the success of a company.

Recent research by the Aberdeen research company (October 2006) found that the most effective manufacturers spend more time simulating upfront and reap the rewards towards the end of their projects.

Stamping simulation is used when a sheet metal part designer or toolmaker desires to assess the likelihood of successfully manufacturing a sheet metal part, without the expense of making a physical tool. Stamping simulation allows any sheet metal part forming process to be simulated in the virtual environment of a PC for a fraction of the expense of a physical tryout.

Results from a stamping simulation allow sheet metal part designers to assess alternative designs very quickly to optimize their parts for low cost manufacture.

== Microstamping ==
While the concept of stamping sheet metal components has traditionally focused on the macro level (e.g. vehicle, aircraft, and packaging applications), the continuing trend of miniaturization has driven research into micro- forms of stamping. From the early development of micropunching machines in the early to mid-2000s to the creation and testing of a microbending machine at Northwestern University in the 2010s, microstamping tools continue to be researched as alternatives to machining and chemical etching. Examples of applications of sheet metal microstamping include electrical connectors, micromeshes, microswitches, microcups for electron guns, wristwatch components, handheld device components, and medical devices. However, key issues such as quality control, high-volume application, and the need for material research into mechanical properties must be addressed before full-scale implementation of the technology is realized.

== Industry-specific applications ==
Metal stamping can be applied to a variety of materials based on their unique metalworking qualities for a number of applications across a wide range of industries. Metal stamping may require the forming and processing of base common metals to rare alloys for their application-specific advantages. Some industries require the electrical or thermal conductivity of beryllium copper in areas such as aerospace, electrical, and the defense industry, or the high strength application of steel and its many alloys for the automotive industry.

Industries metal stamping is used for:

- Aerospace
- Agriculture
- Ammunition
- Major appliances
- Small appliances
- Automotive
- Commercial
- Construction
- Electronics
- Firearms
- HVAC
- Jewellery
- Lawn care equipment
- Lighting
- Lock hardware
- Marine
- Medical
- Plumbing
- Power storage
- Power tools
- Small engines

== See also ==
- Circle grid analysis
- Forming limit diagram
- Four-slide machine, a combination stamping, bending, and punching machine
- Shearing (manufacturing)
- Punching
