= Shear (sheet metal) =

Machine tool for sheet metal cutting

There are many types of shears used to shear or cut sheet metal.

== Types ==
=== Alligator shear ===
An alligator shear, historically known as a lever shear and sometimes as a crocodile shear, is a metal-cutting shear with a hinged jaw, powered by a flywheel or hydraulic cylinder. Alligator shears are generally set up as stand-alone shears; however, there are types for excavators. The jaw size can range from 4 to 36 in (100 to 910 mm) long. They are generally used to cut ferrous members, such as rebar, pipe, angle iron, or I-beams.

=== Bench shear ===
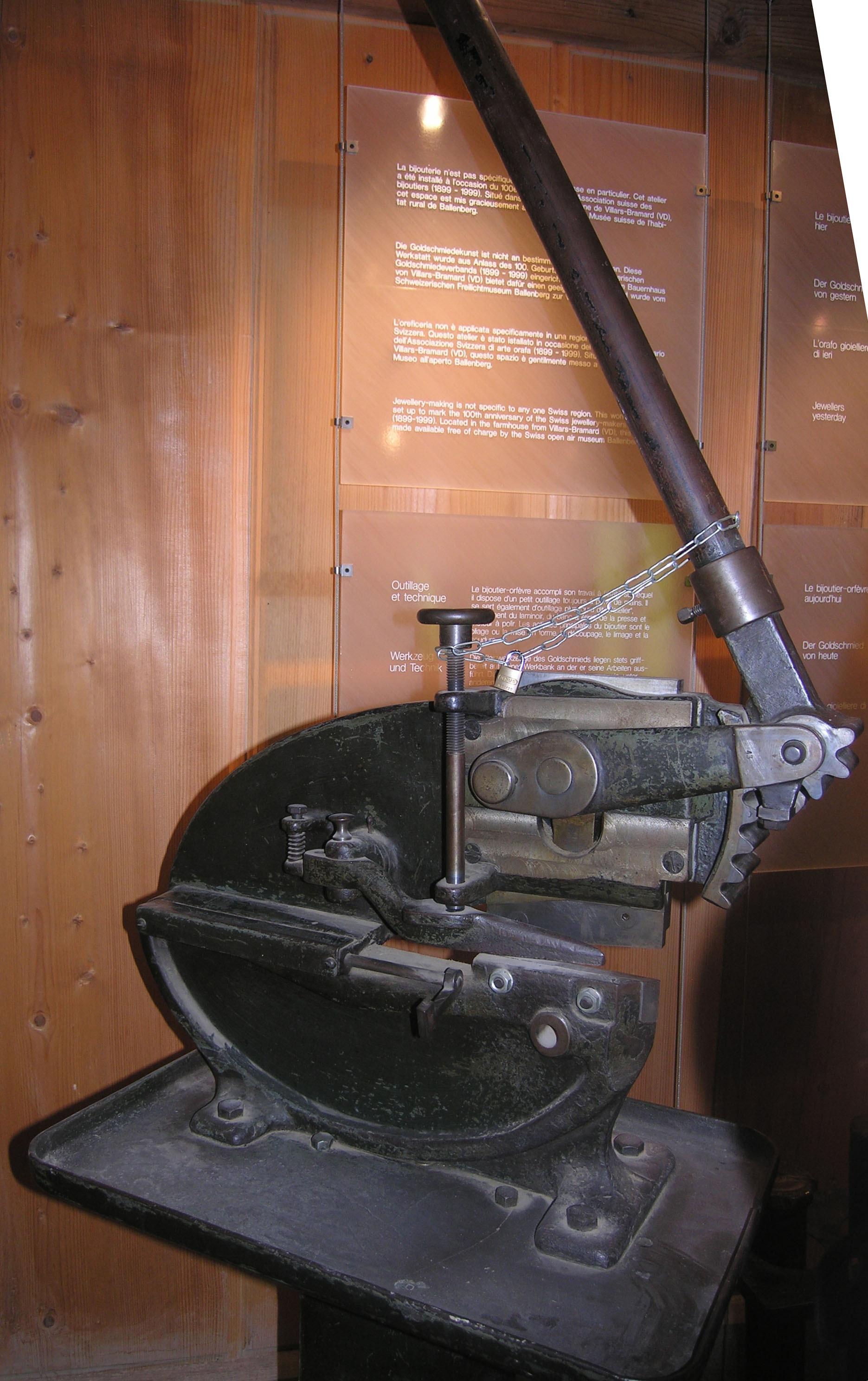
A throat-less bench shear

A bench shear, also known as a lever shear, is a bench mounted shear with a compound mechanism to increase the mechanical advantage. It is usually used for cutting rough shapes out of medium-sized pieces of sheet metal, but cannot do delicate work. For the small shear, it mostly designed for a wide field of applications. Light weight and easy efficient operation, yet very sturdy in construction. The cutting blades fitted are carefully and accurately ground to give easy, clean quick cuts, and free of burrs. These special features help the operators save a great deal of their energy. But some shearing machines can cut sheet bar and flat bar up to 10mm. It is electrically welded together to make it a sturdy stable unit capable to withstand highest stresses due to heavy duty usage. The footplates are reinforced with bracing angles so that they give firm stability to the shear. The machine is provided with section knives with sliding blades which can be adjusted by hand to make 90 cuts on angles and T-sections of different sizes as well as with openings for cutting round and square bars.

=== Guillotine ===
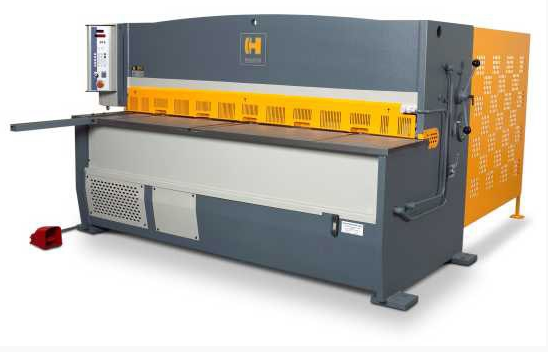
A hydraulic guillotine shear

The machine used is called a squaring shear, power shear, or guillotine. The machine may be foot powered, less commonly hand powered, or mechanically or hydraulically powered. It works by first clamping the material with a ram. A moving blade then comes down across a fixed blade to shear the material. For larger shears the moving blade may be set on an angle or "rocked" in order to shear the material progressively from one side to the other; this angle is referred to as the shear angle. Setting the blade on an angle decreases the amount of force required, but increases the stroke. A 5-degree shear angle decreases the force by about 20%. The amount of energy used is still the same. The moving blade may also be inclined 0.5 to 2.5°, called the rake angle, to keep the material from becoming wedged between the blades. However, raking the blade compromises the squareness of the edge. The machine consists of a shear table, work-holding device, upper and lower blades, and a gauging device. The shear table is the part of the machinery that the workpiece rests on whilst being shorn. The work-holding device is used to hold the workpiece in place and keep it from moving or buckling while under stress. The upper and lower blades are the piece of machinery that actually do the cutting, while the gauging device is used to ensure that the workpiece gets worked where it is supposed to be.

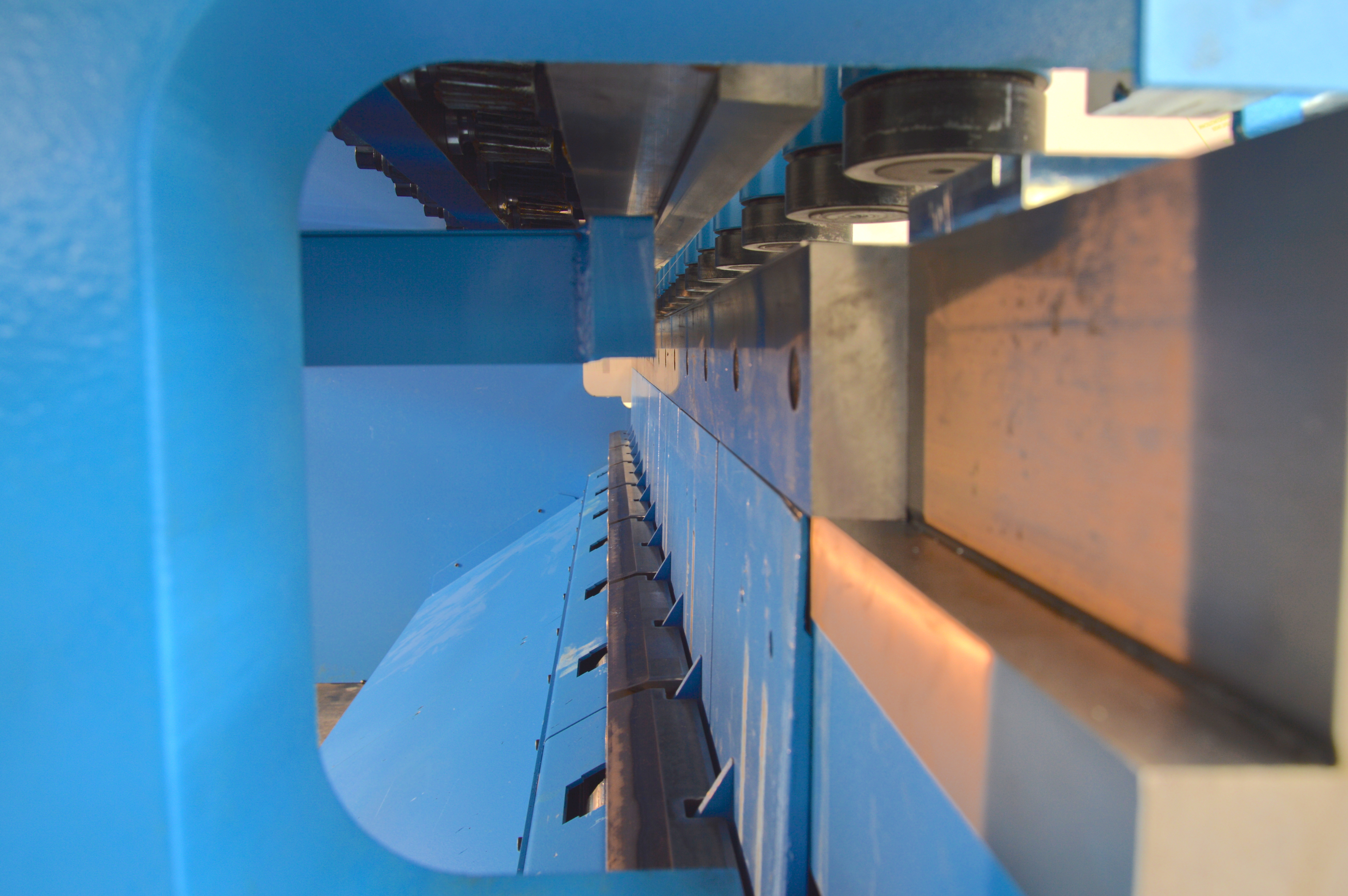
Close-up of upper blade, lower blade, backgauge and work-holding device of a Gasparini guillotine shear

The design of press tools is an engineering compromise. A sharp edge, strength, and durability are ideal, but a sharp edge is not very strong or durable, so blades for metal work tend to be square-edged rather than knife-edged. Typical workpiece materials include aluminum, brass, bronze, and mild steel because of their outstanding shearability ratings. Stainless steel is not sheared as often due to its tendency to work-harden.

Other geometric possibilities include the squaring shear, angle shear, bow-tie shear and bar shear. All of these have many different uses and are all used regularly in certain manufacturing fields.

=== Power shears ===
A power shear is electrically or pneumatically powered hand tool designed to blank large pieces of sheet metal. They are designed to cut straight lines and relatively large radius curves. They are advantageous over a bandsaw because there is not a size limit. Large versions can cut sheet metal up to 12 gauge. An alternative to the hand tools are hydraulically powered tools attached to heavy machinery. They are usually used to cut materials that are too bulky to be transported to a cutting facility, too big or dangerous for the hand tools and are stored at remote locations (e.g. mines, forests).

=== Throatless shear ===
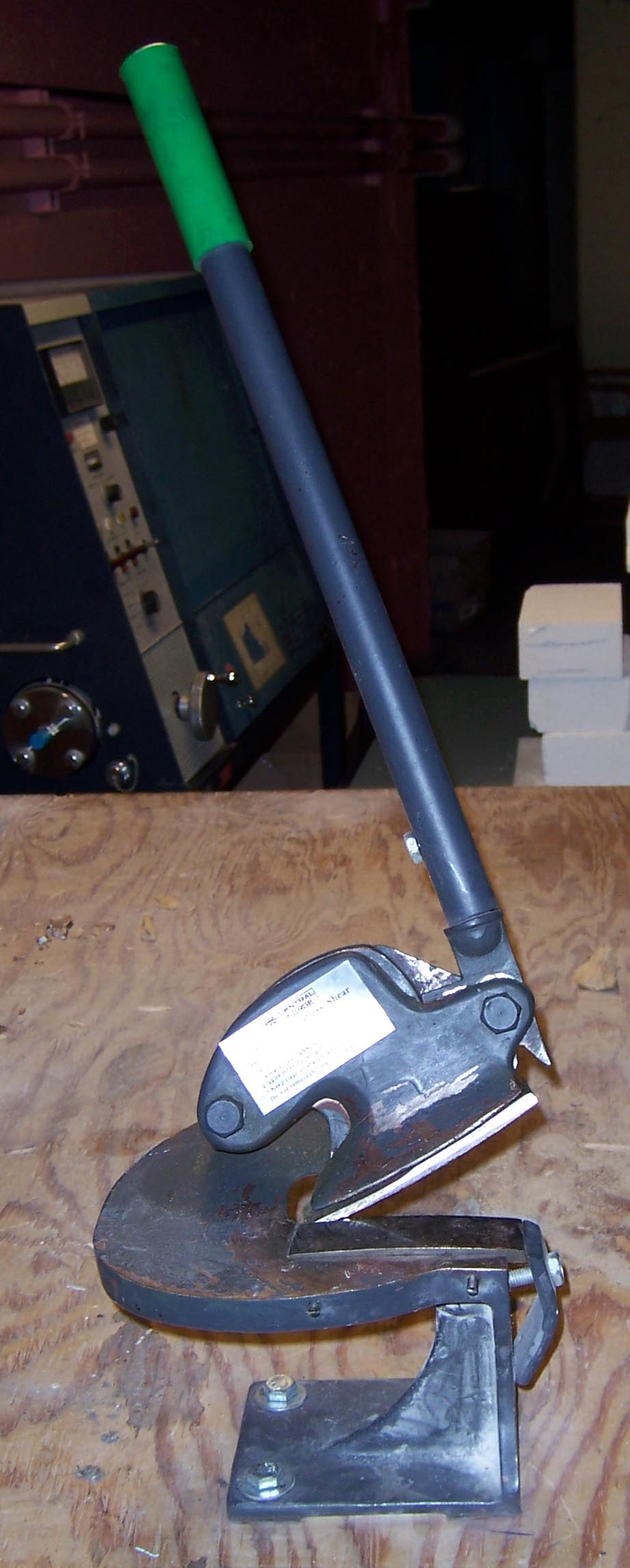
Throatless shear

Closeup of shear jaws

A throatless shear is a cutting tool used to make complex straight and curved cuts in sheet metal. The throatless shear takes its name from the fact that the metal can be freely moved around the cutting blade (it does not have a throat down which metal must be fed), allowing great flexibility in shapes that can be cut.

=== Tin snips ===
Snips, also known as shears, are hand tools used to cut sheet metal and other tough webs. It is a cutting tool. Workers use various types of snips, either straight or blend one be obtained. The straight or bent being not only for straight cuts but for inside of the curvature or concave curvature too. There are two broad categories: tinner's snips, which are similar to common scissors, and compound-action snips, which use a compound leverage handle system to increase the mechanical advantage.

== See also ==
- Nibbler
- Machine tool builders
- Snips
