= Cold shrinking =

Cold shrinking is a process in motor vehicle bodyworks. Compared to hot shrinking, cold shrinking is a longer but nevertheless more preferred method most common especially with larger stretching areas. Cold shrinking is mostly done by use of a dolly hammer. The resulting rough surface is filled using a body filler or a body solder for a smoother finish.

Cold shrinking is a method of panel beating where heating is not done to the stretched panel. This method is mostly suitable for integral cars with integral body panels such as hatchbacks.

== See also ==
- Hot shrinking
- Panel beater
