= Transfer stamping =

Stamping Process coil, blank, draw, trim, flange

Transfer stamping is the use of a transfer press to form sheet metal medium-high volume production environments. The press operates multiple dies as a complete system. Each die is responsible for adding shape to the part until it reaches its ultimate shape. Transfer stamping is unique in that a single press operates multiple tools. The work piece is moved from one operation to the next by automation either built into the press or onto the dies. With each closing of the press the entire system of tools closes, each performing its designated task.

== Background ==
3 die stamping process in a single transfer press

In the past these operations were performed using individual presses and the work pieces were moved from press to press and die to die by hand. Hand loading was then replaced by pick-and-place machines and by robots. The transfer press extended this practice, combining tools in a single large press and using automation specifically designed for press operations.

== Transfer mechanisms ==
=== Tri-axis transfer ===
A tri-axis transfer mechanism's motion features three axes of movement available to part manipulators on each press stroke. On the downstroke the arm holding the work piece lowers the work piece to the tool and retracts to place the part on the tool. At the bottom of the stroke the arm in the retracted state cycles backward one pitch to position itself adjacent to the next workpiece. As the press cycles upward the part manipulators index inward to pick up the next work piece, continuing upward following the press ram, then indexing forward to the next station. As the press reaches the top of its stroke, the process repeats. The three axes of motion are up-down, in-out, and forward-back.

=== Cross-bar transfer ===
With a cross bar transfer mechanism, the in-out movement axis is constrained by an automation bar spanning the die space. Commonly mounted with suction cups, the cross bar picks up the workpiece from above and drops it into place at the next station. With only two axes of motion and the automation spanning the die space, the cross bar transfer mechanism must "dwell" between adjacent tools between each press stroke.
