= Blanking and piercing =

Shearing processes

Blanking versus piercing

Blanking and piercing are shearing processes in which a punch and die are used to produce parts from coil or sheet stock. Blanking produces the outside features of the component, while piercing produces internal holes or shapes. The web is created after multiple components have been produced and is considered scrap material. The "slugs" produced by piercing internal features are also considered scrap. The terms "piercing" and "punching" can be used interchangeably.

== Die roll and burr formation ==
Burrs and die roll are typical features of stamped components. Die roll is created when the material being stamped is compressed before the material begins to shear. Die roll takes the form of a radius around the outside edge of the blank and the pierced holes. After compression, the part shears for about 10% of the part thickness, and then fractures free of the strip or sheet. This fracturing produces a raised, jagged edge which is called a "burr". Burrs are typically removed by tumbling in a secondary process. Burr height can be used as an important indicator of tool wear.

== Tooling design guidelines ==
The selection criteria of all process parameters are governed by the sheet thickness and by the strength of the work-piece material being pierced.

The punch/die clearance is a crucial parameter, which determines the load at the cutting edge of the tool, commonly known as point pressure. Excessive point pressure can accelerate tool wear. The surface quality of the trimmed piece is affected by the clearance, too.

Material specific design guidelines are developed by companies in order to define the minimum acceptable values of hole diameters, bridge sizes, slot dimensions. Similarly, the strip lay-out must be determined (strip width and pitch). The bridge width between the parts and the edge allowance between the part and the edge of the strip also have to be selected.

A simple operation may only need a pancake die. While many dies perform complex procedures simultaneously, a pancake die may only perform one simple procedure with the finished product being removed by hand.

Modern CNC-Nibbling-Machine using different tools

== Process variants ==
There are various types of blanking and piercing: lancing, perforating, notching, nibbling, shaving, cutoff, and dinking.

=== Lancing ===
Lancing is a piercing operation in which the workpiece is sheared and bent with one strike of the die. A key part of this process is that there is not reduction of material, only a modification in its geometry. This operation is used to make tabs, vents, and louvers.

The cut made in lancing is not a closed cut, like in perforation even though a similar machine is used, but a side is left connected to be bent sharply or in more of a rounded manner.

Lancing can be used to make partial contours and free up material for other operations further down the production line. Along with these reasons, lancing is also used to make tabs (where the material is bent at a 90-degree angle to the material), vents (where the bend is around 45 degrees), and louvers (where the piece is rounded or cupped). Lancing also helps to cut or slight shear of sheet on cylindrical shape.

Normally lancing is done on a mechanical press, lancing requires the use of punches and dies to be used. The different punches and dies determine the shape and angle (or curvature) of the newly made section of the material. The dies and punches are needed to be made of tool steel to withstand the repetitious nature of the procedure.

=== Perforating ===
Perforating is a piercing tooling that involves punching a large number of closely spaced holes.

=== Notching ===
Notching is a piercing operation that removes material from the edge of the workpiece.

=== Nibbling ===
The nibbling process cuts a contour by producing a series of overlapping slits or notches. A nibbler may be employed to do this. This allows for complex shapes to be formed in sheet metal up to 6 mm (0.25 in) thick using simple tools. that is essentially a small punch and die that reciprocates quickly; around 300–900 times per minute. Punches are available in various shape and sizes; oblong and rectangular punches are common because they minimize waste and allow for greater distances between strokes, as compared to a round punch. Nibbling can occur on the exterior or interior of the material, however interior cuts require a hole to insert the tool.

The process is often used on parts that do not have quantities that can justify a dedicated blanking die. The edge smoothness is determined by the shape of the cutting die and the amount the cuts overlap; naturally the more the cuts overlap, the cleaner the edge. For added accuracy and smoothness, most shapes created by nibbling undergo filing or grinding processes after completion.

=== Shaving ===
The shaving process is a finishing operation where a small amount of metal is sheared away from an already blanked part. Its main purpose is to obtain better dimensional accuracy, but secondary purposes include squaring the edge and smoothing the edge. Blanked parts can be shaved to an accuracy of up to 0.025 mm (0.001 in). Shaving of metals is done in order to remove excess or scrap metal. A straight, smooth edge is provided and therefore shaving is frequently performed on instrument parts, watch and clock parts, and the like. Shaving is accomplished in shaving dies especially designed for the purpose.

=== Trimming ===
The trimming operation is the last operation performed, because it cuts away excess or unwanted irregular features from the walls of drawn sheets.

=== Fine blanking ===
Typical fine blanking press cross section

Using a Multitool with different punches

Fine blanking is a specialized form of blanking where there is no fracture zone when shearing. This is achieved by compressing the whole part and then an upper and lower punch extract the blank. This allows the process to hold very tight tolerances, and perhaps eliminate secondary operations.

Materials that can be fine blanked include aluminium, brass, copper, and carbon steel, alloy steel, and stainless steels.

Fine blanking requires a specialized fine blanking press. Alternatively, standard presses can be equipped with tools featuring fine blanking pads. Fine blanking presses are similar to other metal stamping presses, but they have a few critical additional parts. A typical compound fine blanking press includes a hardened die punch (male), the hardened blanking die (female), and a guide plate of similar shape/size to the blanking die. The guide plate is the first applied to the material, impinging the material with a sharp protrusion or stinger around the perimeter of the die opening. Next, a counter pressure is applied opposite the punch, and finally, the die punch forces the material through the die opening. Since the guide plate holds the material so tightly, and since the counter pressure is applied, the material is cut in a manner more like extrusion than typical punching. Mechanical properties of the cut benefit similarly with a hardened layer at the cut edge of the part. Because the material is so tightly held and controlled in this setup, part flatness remains very true, distortion is nearly eliminated, and edge burr is minimal. Clearances between the die and punch are generally around 1% of the cut material thickness, which typically varies between 0.5–13 mm (0.020–0.512 in). Currently parts as thick as 19 mm (0.75 in) can be cut using fine blanking. Tolerances between ±0.0003–0.002 in (0.0076–0.0508 mm) are possible, depending on the base material thickness and tensile strength, and part layout.

With standard compound fine blanking processes, multiple parts can often be completed in a single operation. Parts can be pierced, partially pierced, offset (up to 75°), embossed, or coined, often in a single operation. Some combinations may require progressive fine blanking operations, in which multiple operations are performed at the same pressing station. Due to the higher lifetime, blanking punches are usually covered by PVD protective coatings.

The advantages of fine blanking are:

- excellent dimensional control, accuracy, and repeatability through a production run;
- excellent part flatness is retained;
- straight, superior finished edges to other metal stamping processes;
- little need to machine details;
- multiple features can be added simultaneously in 1 operation;
- more economical for large production runs than traditional operations when additional machining cost and time are factored in (1000–20000 parts minimum, depending on secondary machining operations).

One of the main advantages of fine blanking is that slots or holes can be placed very near to the edges of the part, or near to each other. Also, fineblanking can produce holes that are much smaller (as compared to material thickness) than can be produced by conventional stamping.

The disadvantages are:

- slightly slower than traditional punching operations;
- higher equipment costs, due to higher tooling cost when compared to traditional punching operations and to higher tonnage requirements for the presses
