= Nibbler =

Tool for cutting sheet metal

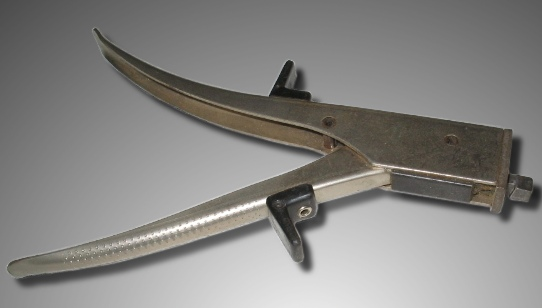
Manual nibbler, punch-and-die type

A nibbler (or pair of nibblers) is a tool for cutting sheet metal with minimal distortion. It may be used for "nibbling": cutting a contour by producing a series of overlapping slits or notches.

One type of nibbler operates much like a punch and die, with a blade that moves in a linear fashion against a fixed die, removing small bits of metal and leaving a kerf approximately 6 mm (0.24 in) wide. Another type operates similar to tin snips, but shears the sheet along two parallel tracks 3–6 mm (0.12–0.24 in) apart, rolling up the waste in a tight spiral as it cuts.

Nibblers may be manual (hand operated) or powered. Power nibblers are often powered by compressed air, though electrical types also exist. A common DIY nibbler tool is an electric drill attachment, which converts the rotary motion of the drill into a reciprocating motion of the jaw.

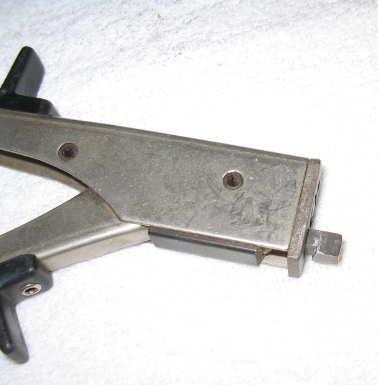
Detail of cutting bit of manual nibbler, punch-and-die type

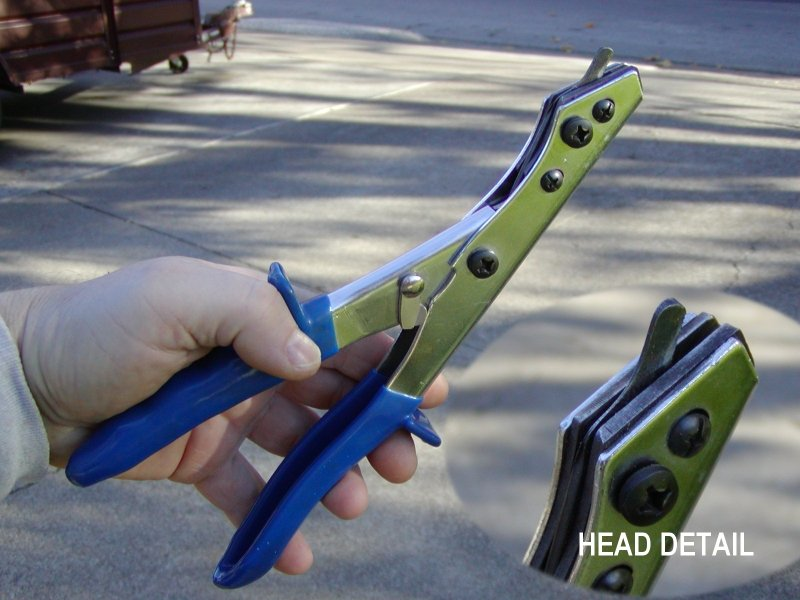
Shear-type nibbler and detail of cutting head
