= Coining (metalworking) =

Form of precision stamping in metalworking

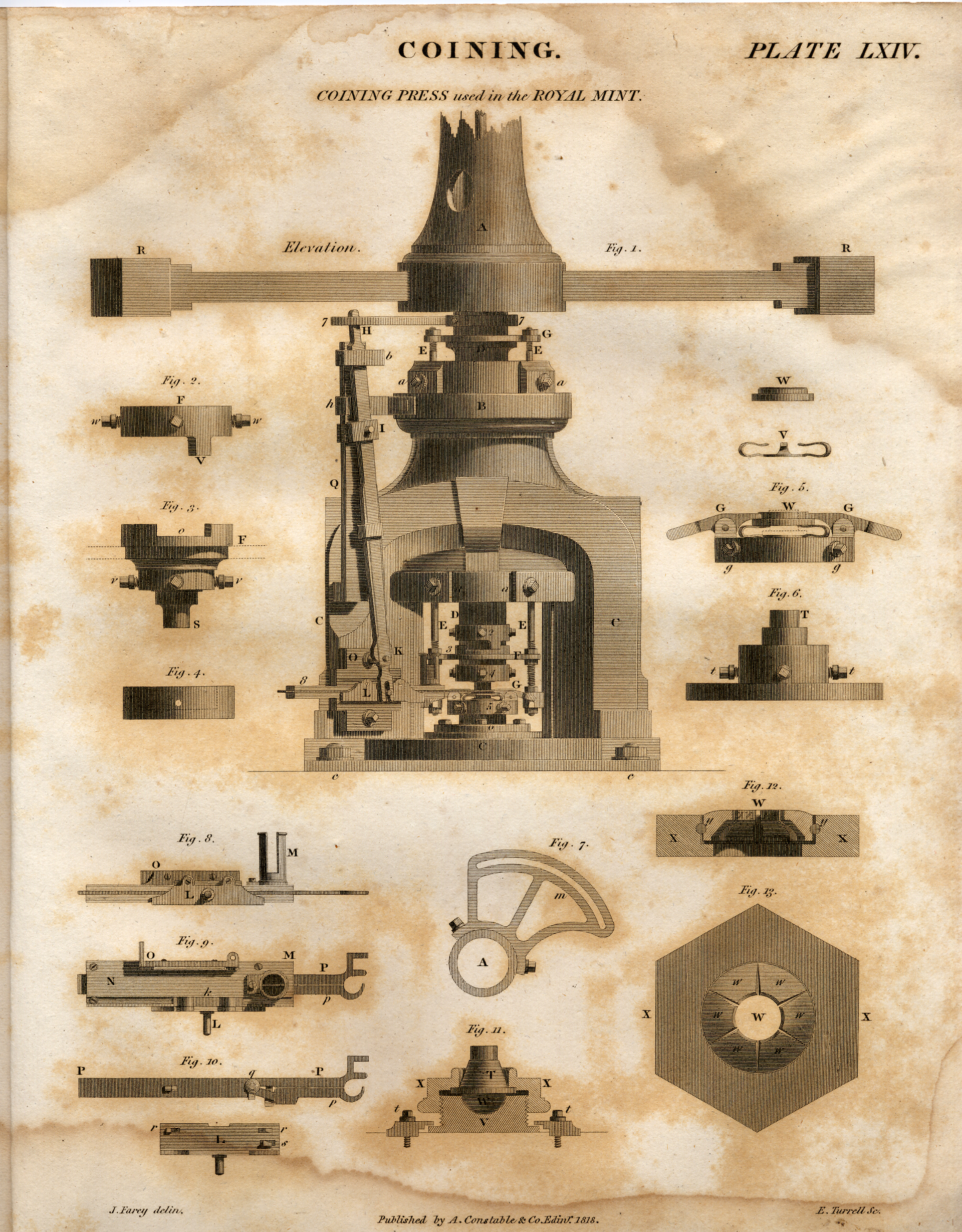
1818 engraving depicting the coining press as used in the Royal Mint

Coining is a form of precision stamping in which a workpiece is subjected to a sufficiently high stress to induce plastic flow on the surface of the material. A beneficial feature is that in some metals, the plastic flow reduces surface grain size, and work hardens the surface, while the material deeper in the part retains its toughness and ductility. The term comes from the initial use of the process: manufacturing of coins.

Coining is used to manufacture parts for all industries and is commonly used when high relief or very fine features are required. For example, it is used to produce coins, badges, buttons, precision-energy springs and precision parts with small or polished surface features.

Coining is a cold working process similar in other respects to forging, which takes place at elevated temperature; it uses a great deal of force to elastically deform a workpiece, so that it conforms to a die. Coining can be done using a gear driven press, a mechanical press, or more commonly, a hydraulically actuated press. Coining typically requires higher tonnage presses than stamping, because the workpiece is elastically deformed and not actually cut, as in some other forms of stamping. The coining process is preferred when there is a high tonnage.

== Coining in electronic industry ==
In soldering of electronic components, bumps are formed on bonding pads to enhance adhesion, which are further flattened by the coining process. Unlike typical coining applications, in this case the goal of coining is to create a flat, rather than patterned, surface.
