= Metalworking =

Process of making items from metal

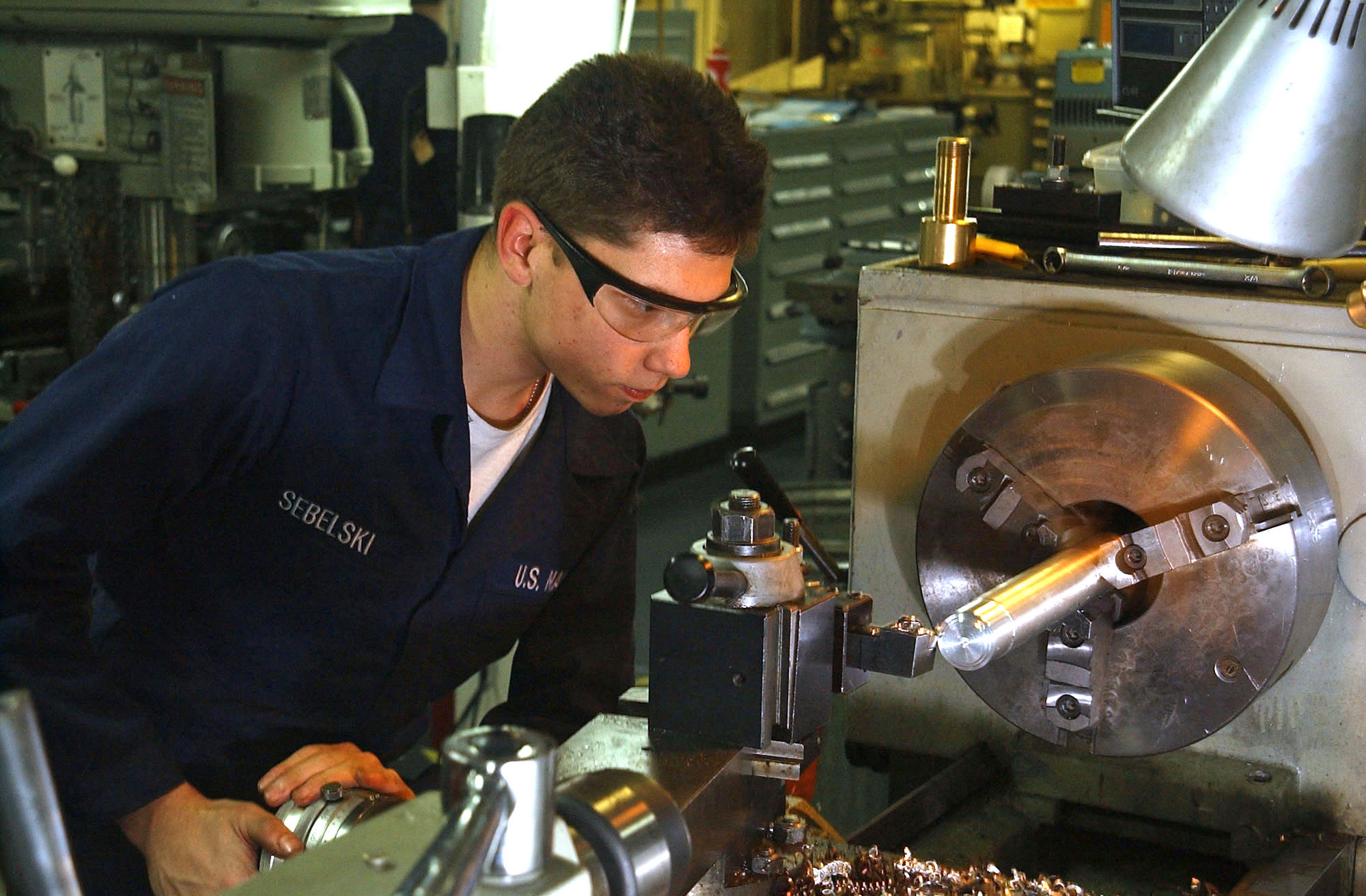
A fireman turning a bar of metal on a lathe on the USS Harry S. Truman in 2004

Metalworking is the process of shaping and reshaping metals in order to create useful objects, parts, assemblies, and large scale structures. As a term, it covers a wide and diverse range of processes, skills, and tools for producing objects on every scale: from huge ships, buildings, and bridges, down to precise engine parts and delicate jewellery.

The historical roots of metalworking predate recorded history; its use spans cultures, civilizations and millennia. It has evolved from shaping soft, native metals like gold with simple hand tools, through the smelting of ores and hot forging of harder metals like iron, up to and including highly technical modern processes such as machining and welding. It has been used as an industry, a driver of trade, individual hobbies, and in the creation of art; it can be regarded as both a science and a craft.

Modern metalworking processes, though diverse and specialized, can be categorized into one of three broad areas known as forming, cutting, or joining processes. Modern metalworking workshops, typically known as machine shops, hold a wide variety of specialized or general-use machine tools capable of creating highly precise, useful products. Many simpler metalworking techniques, such as blacksmithing, are no longer economically competitive on a large scale in developed countries; some of them are still in use in less developed countries, for artisanal or hobby work, or for historical reenactment.

== Prehistory ==
The oldest archaeological evidence of copper mining and working was the discovery of a copper pendant in northern Iraq from 8,700 BCE. The earliest substantiated and dated evidence of metalworking in the Americas was the processing of copper in Wisconsin, near Lake Michigan. Copper was hammered until it became brittle, then heated so it could be worked further. In America, this technology is dated to about 4000–5000 BCE. The oldest gold artifacts in the world come from the Bulgarian Varna Necropolis and date from 4450 BCE.

Not all metal required fire to obtain it or work it. Isaac Asimov speculated that gold was the "first metal". His reasoning being, that, by its chemistry, it is found in nature as nuggets of pure gold. In other words, gold, as rare as it is, is sometimes found in nature as a native metal. Some metals can also be found in meteors. Almost all other metals are found in ores, a mineral-bearing rock, that require heat or some other process to liberate the metal. Another feature of gold is that it is workable as it is found, meaning that no technology beyond a stone hammer and anvil is needed to work the metal. This is a result of gold's properties of malleability and ductility. The earliest tools were stone, bone, wood, and sinew, all of which sufficed to work gold.

At some unknown time, the process of liberating metals from rock by heat became known, and rocks rich in copper, tin, and lead came into demand. These ores were mined wherever they were recognized. Remnants of such ancient mines have been found all over Southwestern Asia. Metalworking was being carried out by the South Asian inhabitants of Mehrgarh between 7000 and 3300 BCE. The end of the beginning of metalworking occurs sometime around 6000 BCE when copper smelting became common in Southwestern Asia.

Ancient civilisations knew of seven metals. Here they are arranged in order of their oxidation potential (in volts):

- Iron +0.44 V,
- Tin +0.14 V
- Lead +0.13 V
- Copper −0.34 V
- Mercury −0.79 V
- Silver −0.80 V
- Gold −1.50 V.

The oxidation potential is important because it is one indicator of how tightly bound to the ore the metal is likely to be. As can be seen, iron is significantly higher than the other six metals while gold is dramatically lower than the six above it. Gold's low oxidation is one of the main reasons that gold is found in nuggets. These nuggets are relatively pure gold and are workable as they are found.

Copper ore, being relatively abundant, and tin ore became the next important substances in the story of metalworking. Using heat to smelt copper from ore, a great deal of copper was produced. It was used for both jewelry and simple tools. However, copper by itself was too soft for tools requiring edges and stiffness. At some point tin was added into the molten copper and bronze was developed thereby. Bronze is an alloy of copper and tin. Bronze was an important advance because it had the edge-durability and stiffness that pure copper lacked. Until the advent of iron, bronze was the most advanced metal for tools and weapons in common use (see Bronze Age for more detail).

Outside Southwestern Asia, these same advances and materials were being discovered and used around the world. People in China and Great Britain began using bronze with little time being devoted to copper. Japanese began the use of bronze and iron almost simultaneously. In the Americas it was different. Although the peoples of the Americas knew of metals, it was not until the European colonisation that metalworking for tools and weapons became common. Jewelry and art were the principal uses of metals in the Americas prior to European influence.

About 2700 BCE, production of bronze was common in locales where the necessary materials could be assembled for smelting, heating, and working the metal. Iron was beginning to be smelted and began its emergence as an important metal for tools and weapons. The period that followed became known as the Iron Age.

== History ==
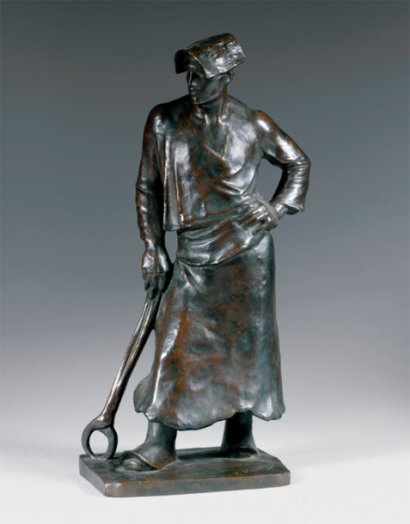
Le Marteleur by Constantin Meunier (1886)

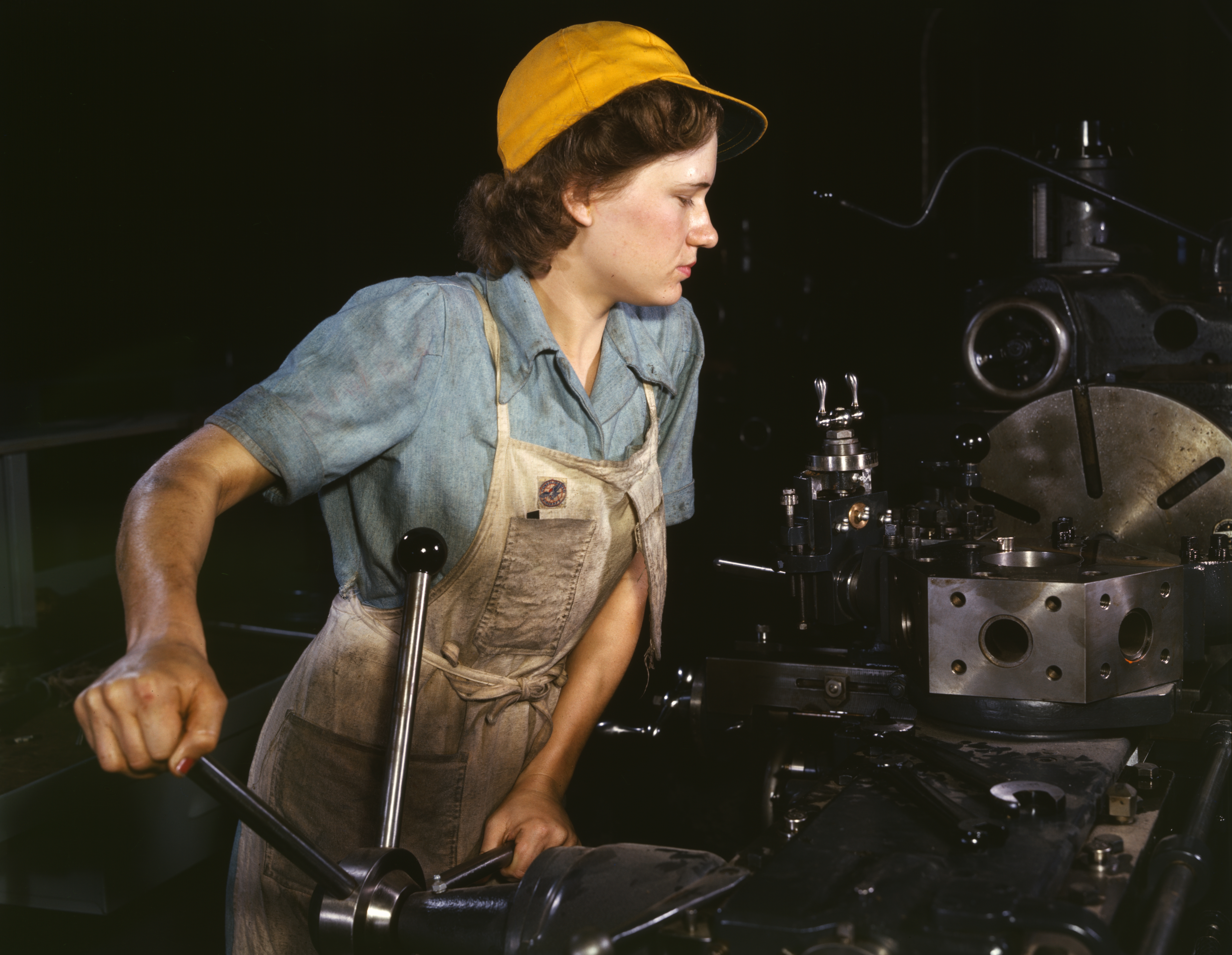
A turret-lathe operator machining parts for transport planes at the Consolidated Aircraft Corporation plant, Fort Worth, Texas, USA, in the 1940s

By the historical periods of the Pharaohs in Egypt, the Vedic kings in India, the Tribes of Israel, and the Maya civilization in North America, among other ancient populations, humans had begun to attach value to precious metals over and above any available functional metal tools and weapons. Gold or silver trinkets became luxury goods in antiquity. In some cases rules for ownership, distribution, and trade were created, enforced, and agreed upon by various peoples. By the above periods metalworkers were very skilled at creating objects of adornment, religious artifacts, and trade instruments of precious metals (non-ferrous), as well as weaponry (usually of ferrous metals and/or alloys). Sophisticated techniques were practiced by artisans, blacksmiths, atharvavedic practitioners, alchemists, and other categories of metalworkers around the globe. For example, the granulation technique occurs in numerous ancient cultures before the historic record shows people traveled to far regions to share this process. Metalsmiths today still use this and many other ancient techniques.

Over time, metal objects became more common and ever more complex. The need to further acquire and work metals grew in importance. Skills related to extracting metal ores from the earth began to evolve, and metalsmiths became more knowledgeable. Metalsmiths became important members of society. Fates and economies of entire civilizations were greatly affected by the availability of metals and metalsmiths. The metalworker depends on the extraction of precious metals to make jewelry, build more efficient electronics, and for industrial and technological applications from construction to shipping containers to rail, and air transport. Without metals, goods and services would cease to move around the globe on the scale we know today.

== General processes ==
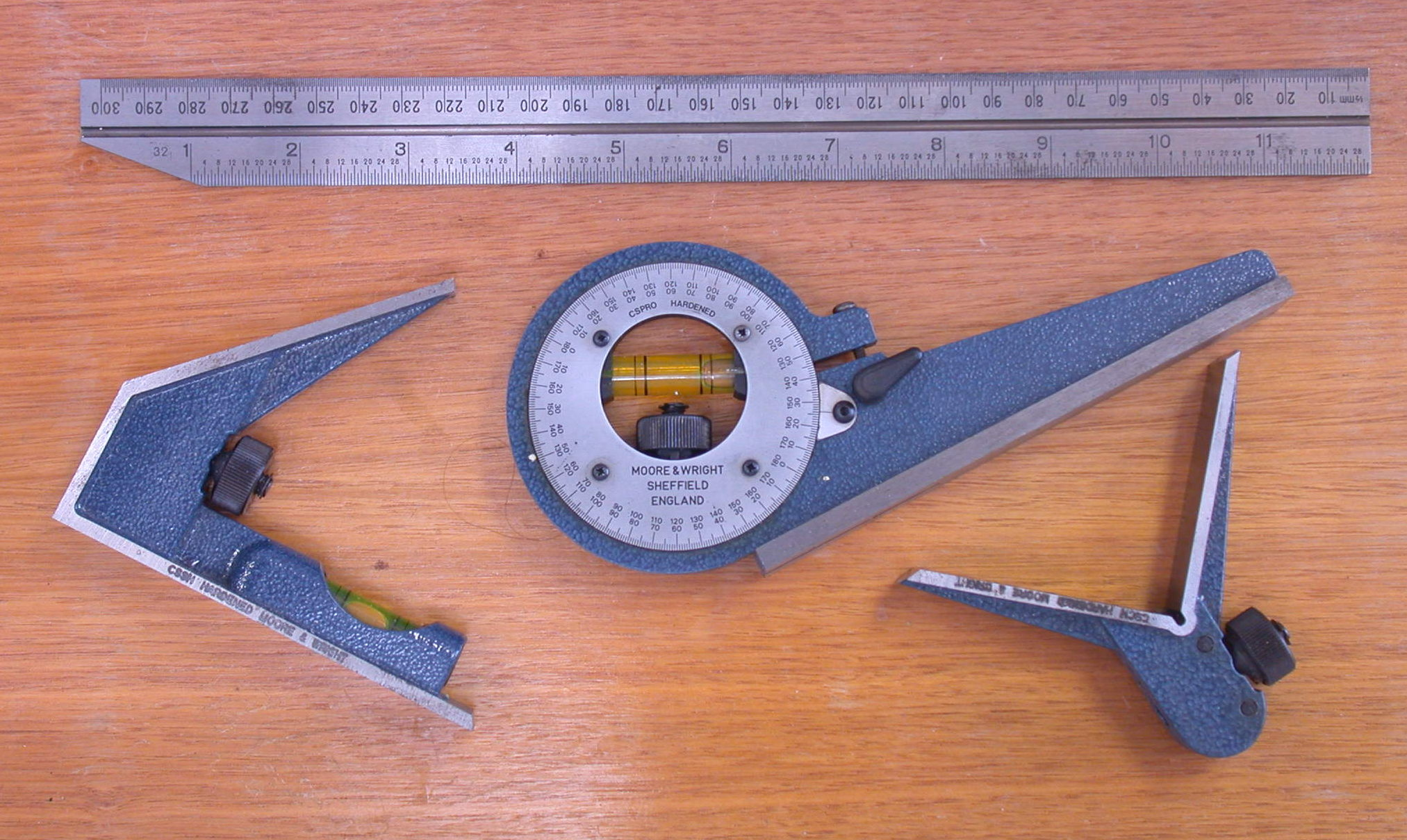
A combination square used for transferring designs

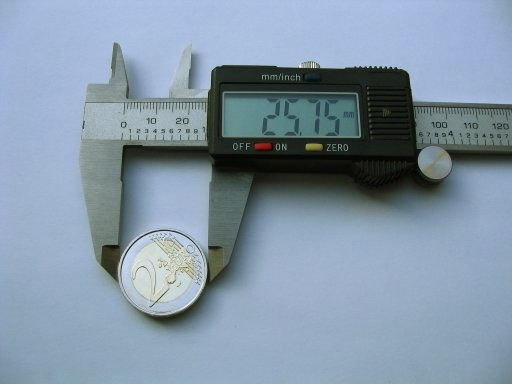
A caliper is used to precisely measure a short length.

Metalworking generally is divided into three categories: forming, cutting, and joining. Most metal cutting is done by high speed steel tools or carbide tools. Each of these categories contains various processes.

Prior to most operations, the metal must be marked out and/or measured, depending on the desired finished product.

Marking out (also known as layout) is the process of transferring a design or pattern to a workpiece and is the first step in the handcraft of metalworking. It is performed in many industries or hobbies, although in industry, the repetition eliminates the need to mark out every individual piece. In the metal trades area, marking out consists of transferring the engineer's plan to the workpiece in preparation for the next step, machining or manufacture.

Calipers are hand tools designed to precisely measure the distance between two points. Most calipers have two sets of flat, parallel edges used for inner or outer diameter measurements. These calipers can be accurate to within one-thousandth of an inch (25.4 μm). Different types of calipers have different mechanisms for displaying the distance measured. Where larger objects need to be measured with less precision, a tape measure is often used.

Compatibility chart of materials versus processes
| | Material | | | | | | | | | | |
| Process | Iron | Steel | Aluminium | Copper | Magnesium | Nickel | Refractory metals | Titanium | Zinc | Brass | Bronze |
|---|---|---|---|---|---|---|---|---|---|---|---|
| Sand casting | X | X | X | X | X | X | | | 0 | 0 | X |
| Permanent mold casting | X | 0 | X | 0 | X | 0 | | | 0 | 0 | X |
| Die casting | | | X | 0 | X | | | | X | | |
| Investment casting | | X | X | X | 0 | 0 | | | | 0 | X |
| Ablation casting | | X | X | X | 0 | 0 | | | | | |
| Open-die forging | | 0 | X | X | X | 0 | 0 | 0 | | | |
| Closed-die forging | | X | 0 | 0 | 0 | 0 | 0 | 0 | | | |
| Extrusion | | 0 | X | X | X | 0 | 0 | 0 | | | |
| Cold heading | | X | X | X | | 0 | | | | | |
| Stamping & deep drawing | | X | X | X | 0 | X | | 0 | 0 | | |
| Screw machine | 0 | X | X | X | 0 | X | 0 | 0 | 0 | X | X |
| Powder metallurgy | X | X | 0 | X | | 0 | X | 0 | | | |
Key: X = Routinely performed, 0 = Performed with difficulty, caution, or some sacrifice, blank = Not recommended

== Casting ==
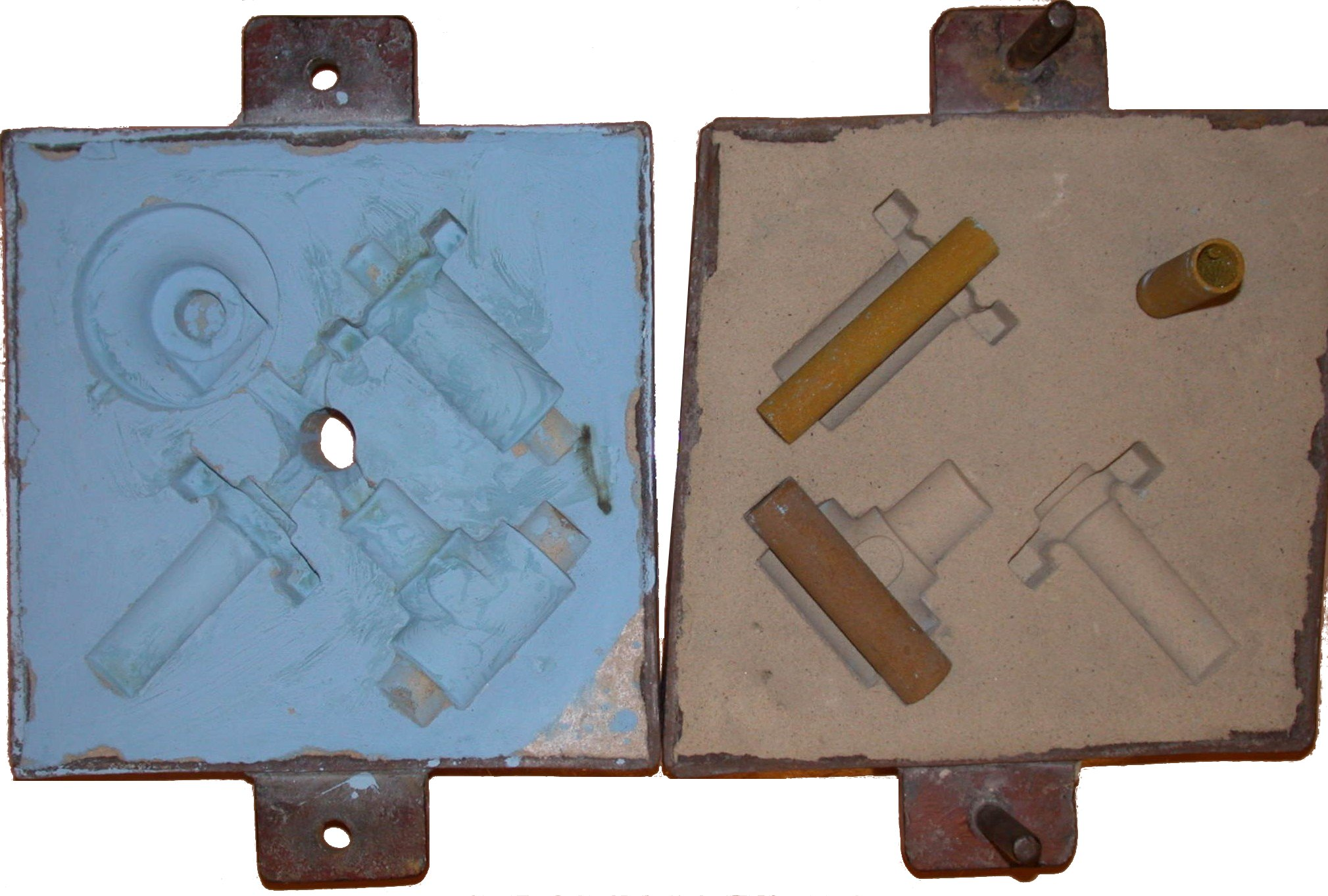
A sand casting mold

Casting achieves a specific form by pouring molten metal into a mold and allowing it to cool, with no mechanical force. Forms of casting include:

- Investment casting (called lost wax casting in art)
- Centrifugal casting
- Die casting
- Sand casting
- Shell casting
- Spin casting

== Forming processes ==
These forming processes modify metal or workpiece by deforming the object, that is, without removing any material. Forming is done with a system of mechanical forces and, especially for bulk metal forming, with heat.

=== Bulk forming processes ===
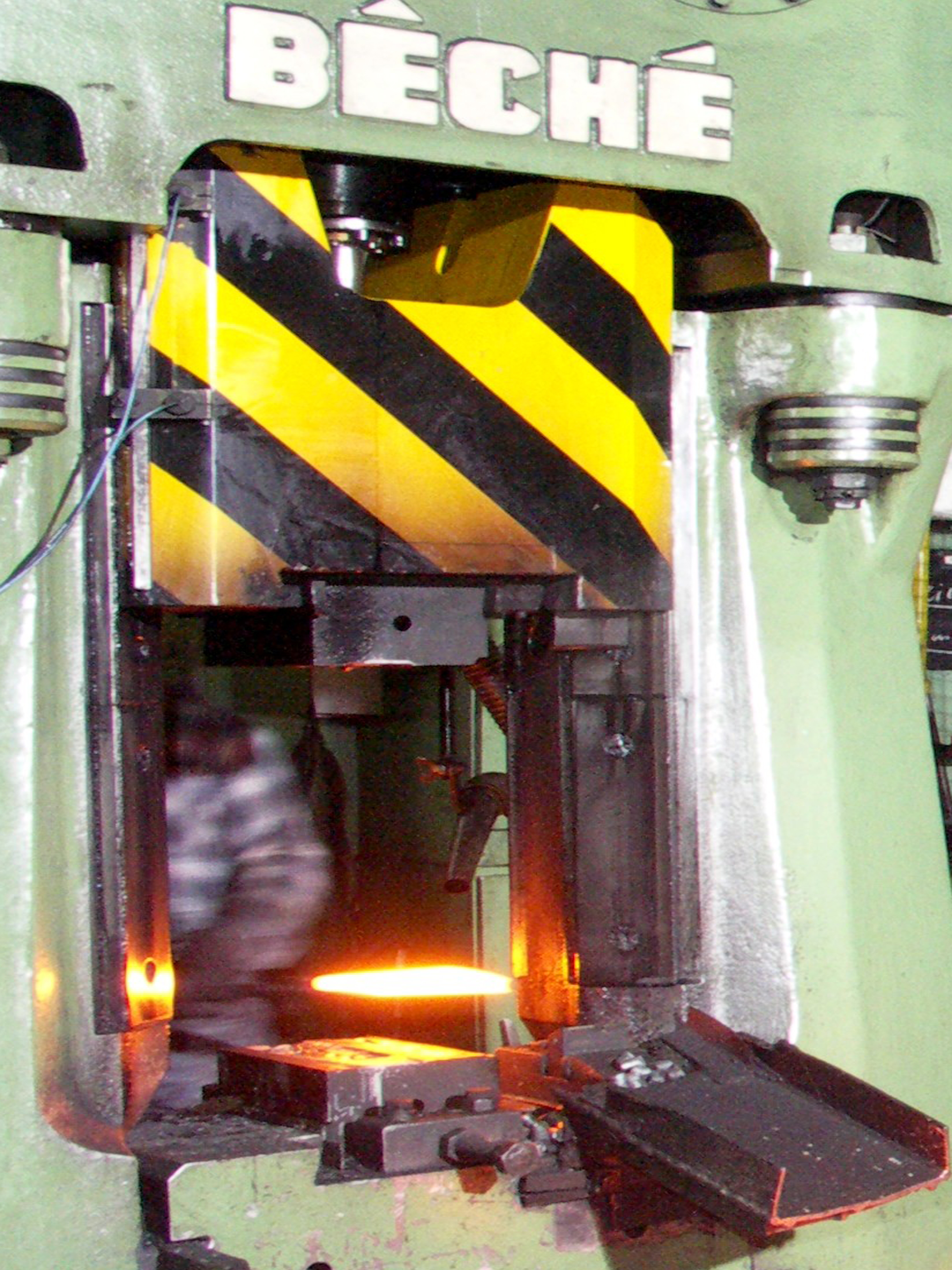
A red-hot metal workpiece is inserted into a forging press.

Plastic deformation involves using heat or pressure to make a workpiece more conductive to mechanical force. Historically, this and casting were done by blacksmiths, though today the process has been industrialized. In bulk metal forming, the workpiece is generally heated up.

- Cold sizing
- Extrusion
- Drawing
- Forging
- Powder metallurgy
- Friction drilling
- Rolling
- Burnishing

=== Sheet (and tube) forming processes ===
These types of forming process involve the application of mechanical force at room temperature. However, some recent developments involve the heating of dies and/or parts. Advancements in automated metalworking technology have made progressive die stamping possible which is a method that can encompass punching, coining, bending and several other ways below that modify metal at less cost while resulting in less scrap.

- Bending
- Coining
- Decambering
- Deep drawing (DD)
- Foldforming
- Hydroforming (HF)
- Hot metal gas forming
- Hot press hardening
- Incremental forming (IF)
- Spinning, Shear forming or Flowforming
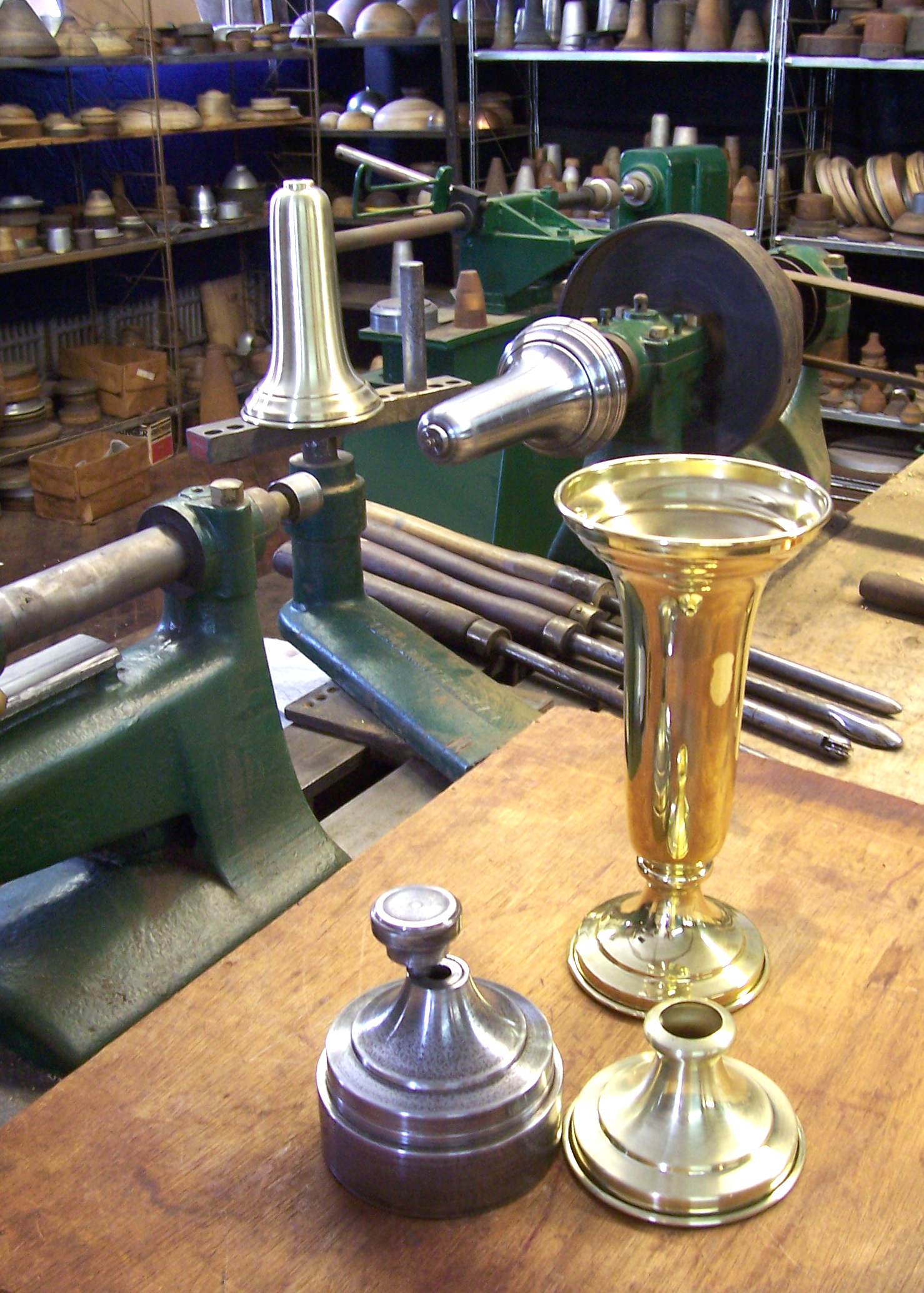
  A metal spun brass vase
- Planishing
- Raising
- Roll forming
- Roll bending
- Repoussé and chasing
- Rubber pad forming
- Shearing
- Stamping
- Superplastic forming (SPF)
- Wheeling using an English wheel (wheeling machine)

== Cutting processes ==
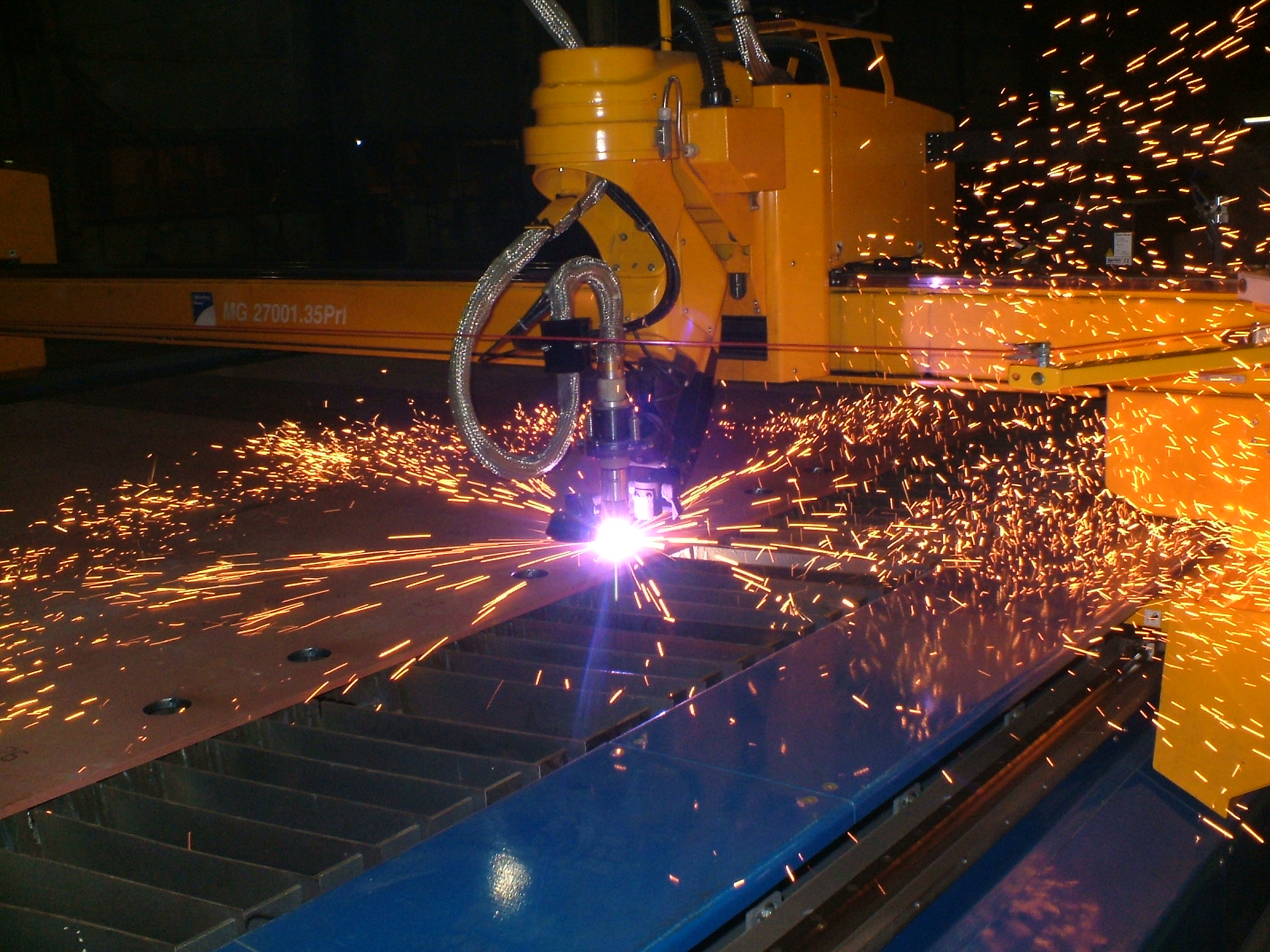
A CNC plasma cutting machine

Cutting is a collection of processes wherein material is brought to a specified geometry by removing excess material using various kinds of tooling to leave a finished part that meets specifications. The net result of cutting is two products, the waste or excess material, and the finished part. In woodworking, the waste would be sawdust and excess wood. In cutting metals the waste is chips or swarf and excess metal.

Cutting processes fall into one of three major categories:

- Chip producing processes most commonly known as machining
- Burning, a set of processes wherein the metal is cut by oxidizing a kerf to separate pieces of metal
- Miscellaneous specialty process, not falling easily into either of the above categories

Drilling a hole in a metal part is the most common example of a chip producing process. Using an oxy-fuel cutting torch to separate a plate of steel into smaller pieces is an example of burning. Chemical milling is an example of a specialty process that removes excess material by the use of etching chemicals and masking chemicals.

There are many technologies available to cut metal, including:

- Manual technologies: saw, chisel, shear or snips
- Machine technologies: turning, milling, drilling, grinding, sawing
- Welding/burning technologies: burning by laser, oxy-fuel burning, and plasma
- Erosion technologies: by water jet, electric discharge, or abrasive flow machining.
- Chemical technologies: Photochemical machining

Cutting fluid or coolant is used where there is significant friction and heat at the cutting interface between a cutter such as a drill or an end mill and the workpiece. Coolant is generally introduced by a spray across the face of the tool and workpiece to decrease friction and temperature at the cutting tool/workpiece interface to prevent excessive tool wear. In practice there are many methods of delivering coolant.

=== Health effects ===
Large amounts of potentially harmful particulates (metal dust) are being generated when an angle grinder is used to cut a steel chain.)

The use of an angle grinder in cutting is not preferred as large amounts of harmful sparks and fumes (and particulates) are generated when compared with using reciprocating saw or band saw. Angle grinders produce sparks when cutting ferrous metals. They also produce shards cutting other materials.

=== Milling ===
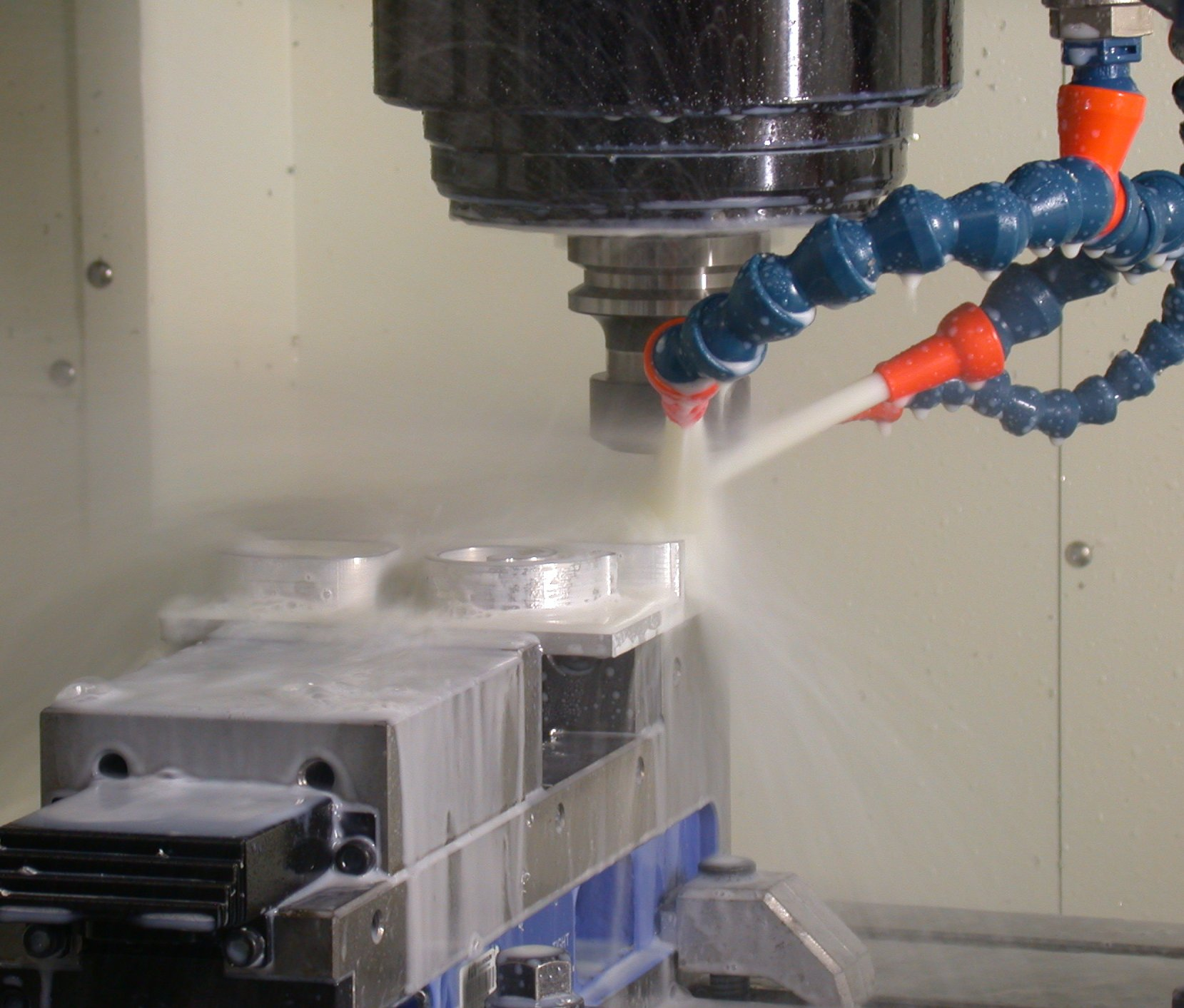
A milling machine in operation, including coolant hoses

Milling is the complex shaping of metal or other materials by removing material to form the final shape. It is generally done on a milling machine, a power-driven machine that in its basic form consists of a milling cutter that rotates about the spindle axis (like a drill), and a worktable that can move in multiple directions (usually two dimensions [x and y axis] relative to the workpiece). The spindle usually moves in the z axis. It is possible to raise the table (where the workpiece rests). Milling machines may be operated manually or under computer numerical control (CNC), and can perform a vast number of complex operations, such as slot cutting, planing, drilling and threading, rabbeting, routing, etc. Two common types of mills are the horizontal mill and vertical mill.

The pieces produced are usually complex 3D objects that are converted into x, y, and z coordinates that are then fed into the CNC machine and allow it to complete the tasks required. The milling machine can produce most parts in 3D, but some require the objects to be rotated around the x, y, or z coordinate axis (depending on the need). Tolerances come in a variety of standards, depending on the locale. In countries still using the imperial system, this is usually in the thousandths of an inch (unit known as thou), depending on the specific machine. In many other European countries, standards following the ISO are used instead.

In order to keep both the bit and material cool, a high temperature coolant is used. In most cases the coolant is sprayed from a hose directly onto the bit and material. This coolant can either be machine or user controlled, depending on the machine.

Materials that can be milled range from aluminum to stainless steel and almost everything in between. Each material requires a different speed on the milling tool and varies in the amount of material that can be removed in one pass of the tool. Harder materials are usually milled at slower speeds with small amounts of material removed. Softer materials vary, but usually are milled with a high bit speed.

The use of a milling machine adds costs that are factored into the manufacturing process. Each time the machine is used coolant is also used, which must be periodically added in order to prevent breaking bits. A milling bit must also be changed as needed in order to prevent damage to the material. Time is the biggest factor for costs. Complex parts can require hours to complete, while very simple parts take only minutes. This in turn varies the production time as well, as each part will require different amounts of time.

Safety is key with these machines. The bits are traveling at high speeds and removing pieces of usually scalding hot metal. The advantage of having a CNC milling machine is that it protects the machine operator.

=== Turning ===
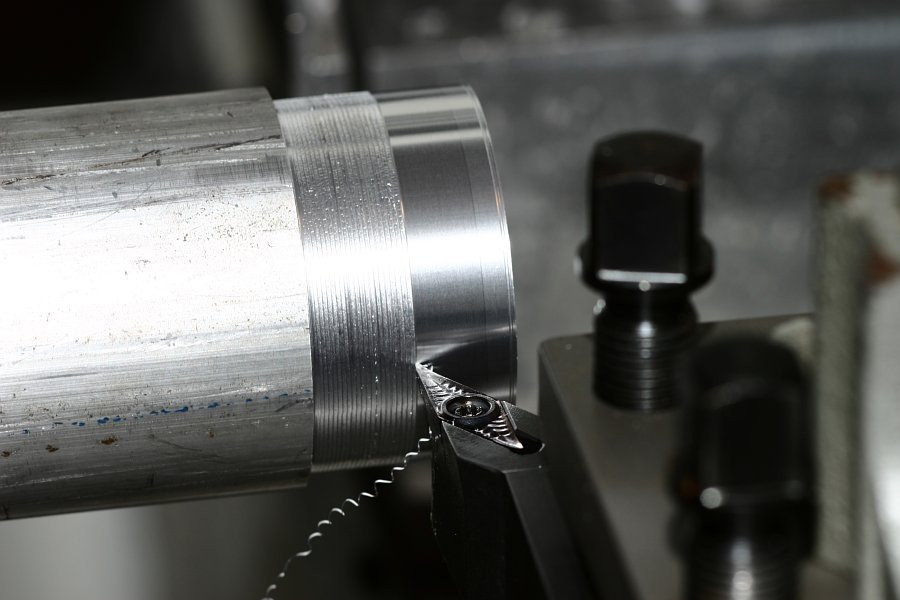
A lathe cutting material from a workpiece

Turning is a metal cutting process for producing a cylindrical surface with a single point tool. The workpiece is rotated on a spindle and the cutting tool is fed into it radially, axially or both. Producing surfaces perpendicular to the workpiece axis is called facing. Producing surfaces using both radial and axial feeds is called profiling.

A lathe is a machine tool which spins a block or cylinder of material so that when abrasive, cutting, or deformation tools are applied to the workpiece, it can be shaped to produce an object which has rotational symmetry about an axis of rotation. Examples of objects that can be produced on a lathe include candlestick holders, crankshafts, camshafts, and bearing mounts.

Lathes have four main components: the bed, the headstock, the carriage, and the tailstock. The bed is a precise & very strong base which all of the other components rest upon for alignment. The headstock's spindle secures the workpiece with a chuck, whose jaws (usually three or four) are tightened around the piece. The spindle rotates at high speed, providing the energy to cut the material. While historically lathes were powered by belts from a line shaft, modern examples uses electric motors. The workpiece extends out of the spindle along the axis of rotation above the flat bed. The carriage is a platform that can be moved, precisely and independently parallel and perpendicular to the axis of rotation. A hardened cutting tool is held at the desired height (usually the middle of the workpiece) by the toolpost. The carriage is then moved around the rotating workpiece, and the cutting tool gradually removes material from the workpiece. The tailstock can be slid along the axis of rotation and then locked in place as necessary. It may hold centers to further secure the workpiece, or cutting tools driven into the end of the workpiece.

Other operations that can be performed with a single point tool on a lathe are:

Chamfering: Cutting an angle on the corner of a cylinder.
Parting: The tool is fed radially into the workpiece to cut off the end of a part.
Threading: A tool is fed along and across the outside or inside surface of rotating parts to produce external or internal threads.
Boring: A single-point tool is fed linearly and parallel to the axis of rotation to create a round hole.
Drilling: Feeding the drill into the workpiece axially.
Knurling: Uses a tool to produce a rough surface texture on the work piece. Frequently used to allow grip by hand on a metal part.

Modern computer numerical control (CNC) lathes and (CNC) machining centres can do secondary operations like milling by using driven tools. When driven tools are used the work piece stops rotating and the driven tool executes the machining operation with a rotating cutting tool. The CNC machines use x, y, and z coordinates in order to control the turning tools and produce the product. Most modern day CNC lathes are able to produce most turned objects in 3D.

Nearly all types of metal can be turned, although more time & specialist cutting tools are needed for harder workpieces.

=== Threading ===
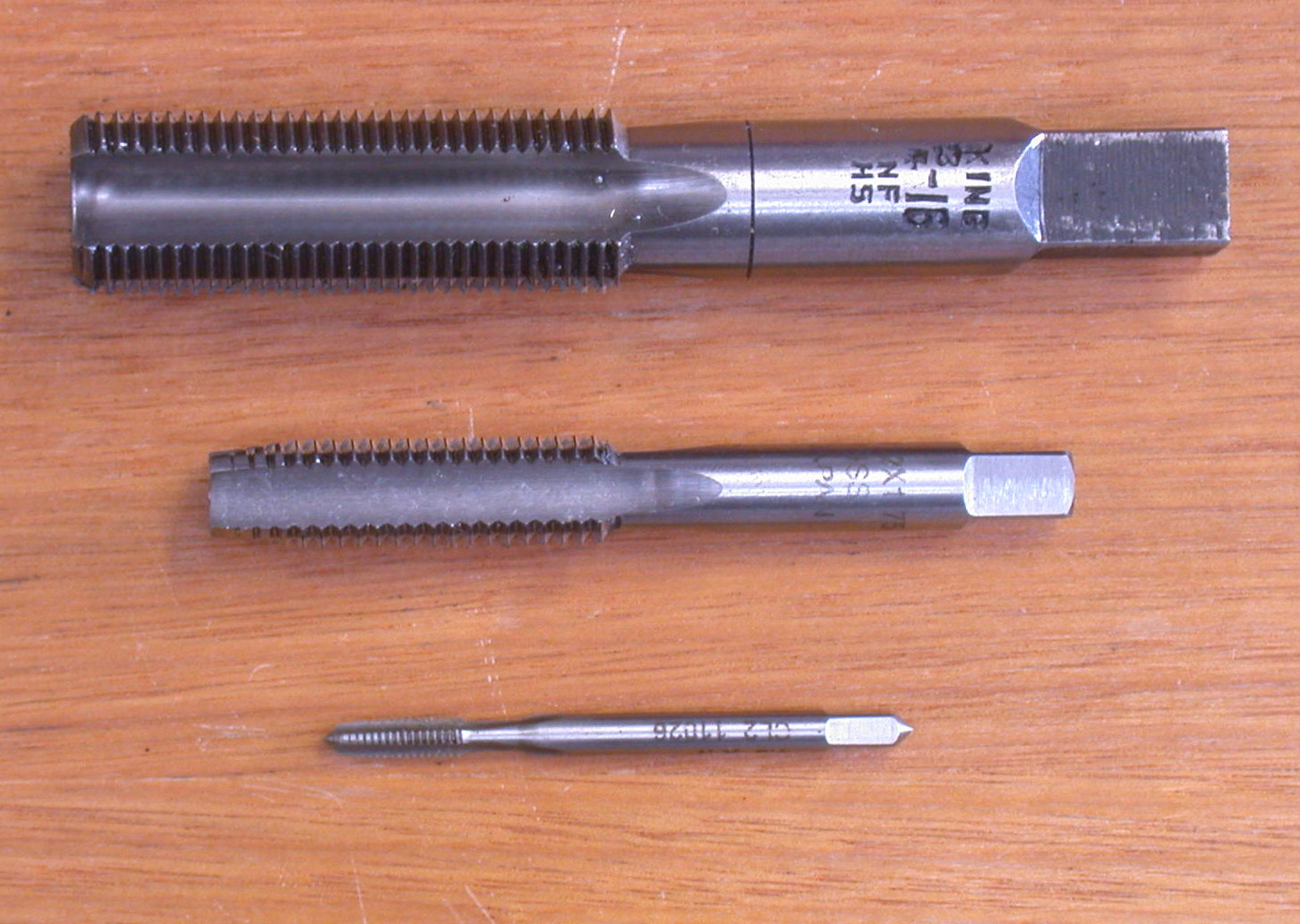
Three different types and sizes of taps

There are many threading processes including: cutting threads with a tap or die, thread milling, single-point thread cutting, thread rolling, cold root rolling and forming, and thread grinding. A tap is used to cut a female thread on the inside surface of a pre-drilled hole, while a die cuts a male thread on a preformed cylindrical rod.

=== Grinding ===
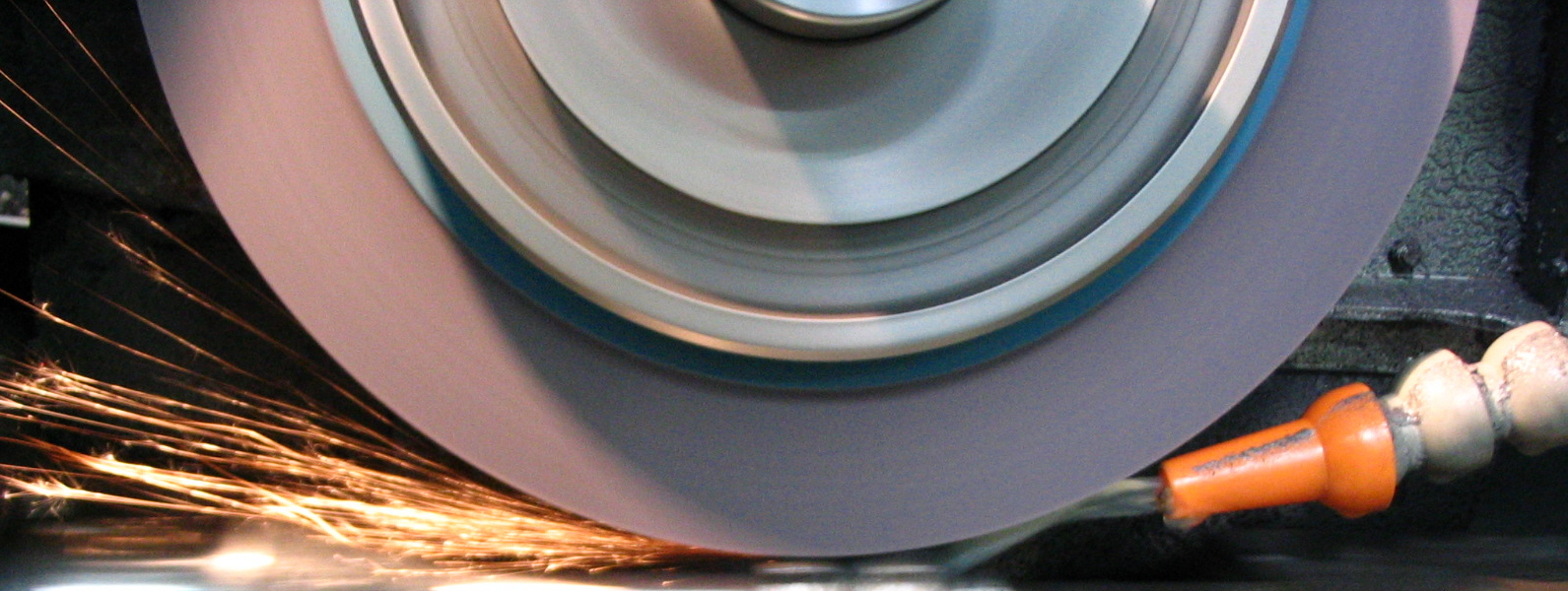
A surface grinder

Grinding uses an abrasive process to remove material from the workpiece. A grinding machine is a machine tool used for producing very fine finishes, making very light cuts, or high precision forms using an abrasive wheel as the cutting device. This wheel can be made up of various sizes and types of stones, diamonds or inorganic materials.

The simplest grinder is a bench grinder or a hand-held angle grinder, for deburring parts or cutting metal with a zip-disc.

Grinders have increased in size and complexity with advances in time and technology. From the old days of a manual toolroom grinder sharpening endmills for a production shop, to today's 30000 RPM CNC auto-loading manufacturing cell producing jet turbines, grinding processes vary greatly.

Grinders need to be very rigid machines to produce the required finish. Some grinders are even used to produce glass scales for positioning CNC machine axis. The common rule is the machines used to produce scales be 10 times more accurate than the machines the parts are produced for.

In the past grinders were used for finishing operations only because of limitations of tooling. Modern grinding wheel materials and the use of industrial diamonds or other man-made coatings (cubic boron nitride) on wheel forms have allowed grinders to achieve excellent results in production environments instead of being relegated to the back of the shop.

Modern technology has advanced grinding operations to include CNC controls, high material removal rates with high precision, lending itself well to aerospace applications and high volume production runs of precision components.

=== Filing ===
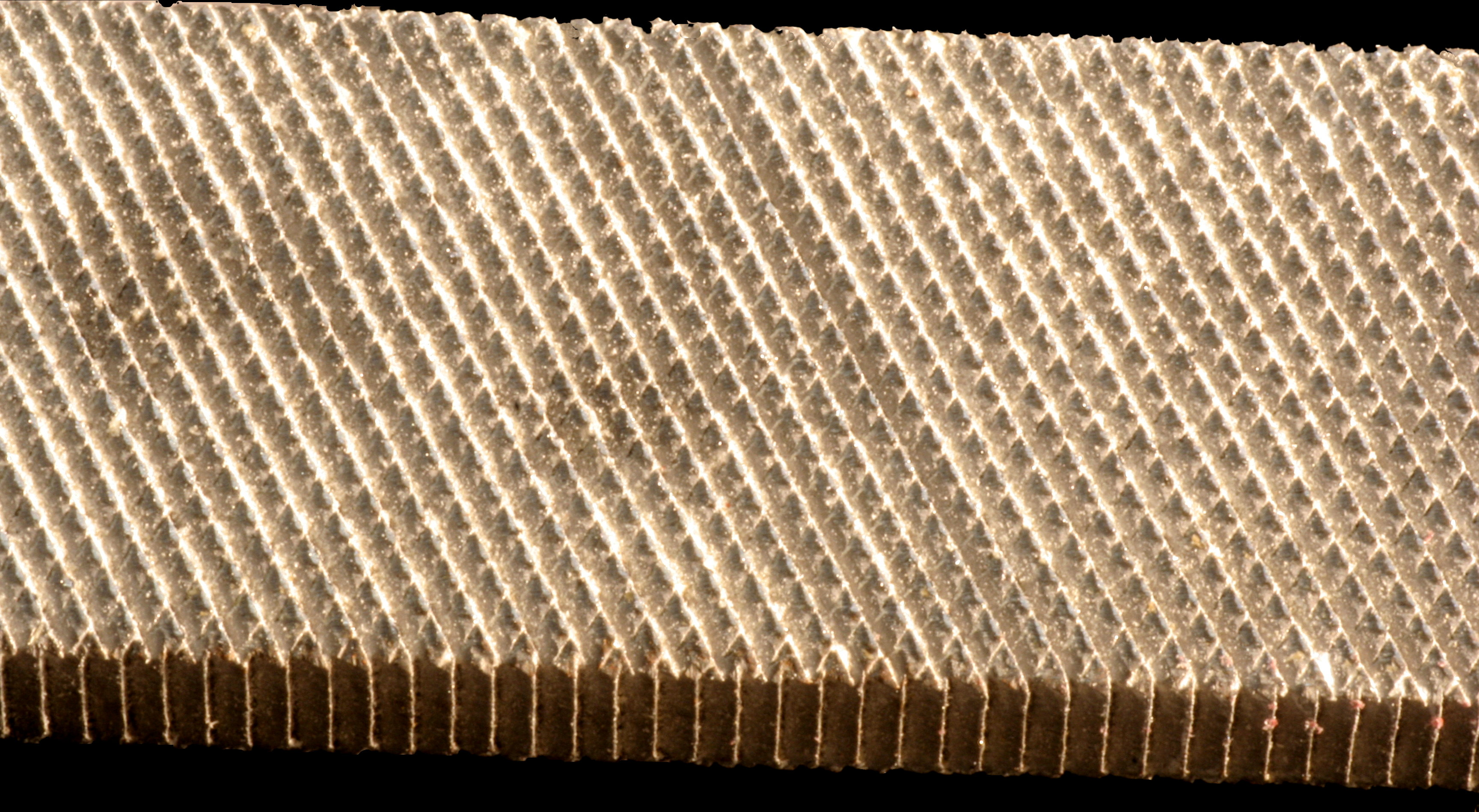
A file is an abrasive surface like this one that allows machinists to remove small, imprecise amounts of metal.

Filing is combination of grinding and saw tooth cutting using a file. Prior to the development of modern machining equipment it provided a relatively accurate means for the production of small parts, especially those with flat surfaces. The skilled use of a file allowed a machinist to work to fine tolerances and was the hallmark of the craft. Today filing is rarely used as a production technique in industry, though it remains as a common method of deburring.

=== Other ===
Broaching is a machining operation used to cut keyways into shafts. Electron beam machining (EBM) is a machining process where high-velocity electrons are directed toward a work piece, creating heat and vaporizing the material. Ultrasonic machining uses ultrasonic vibrations to machine very hard or brittle materials.

== Joining processes ==
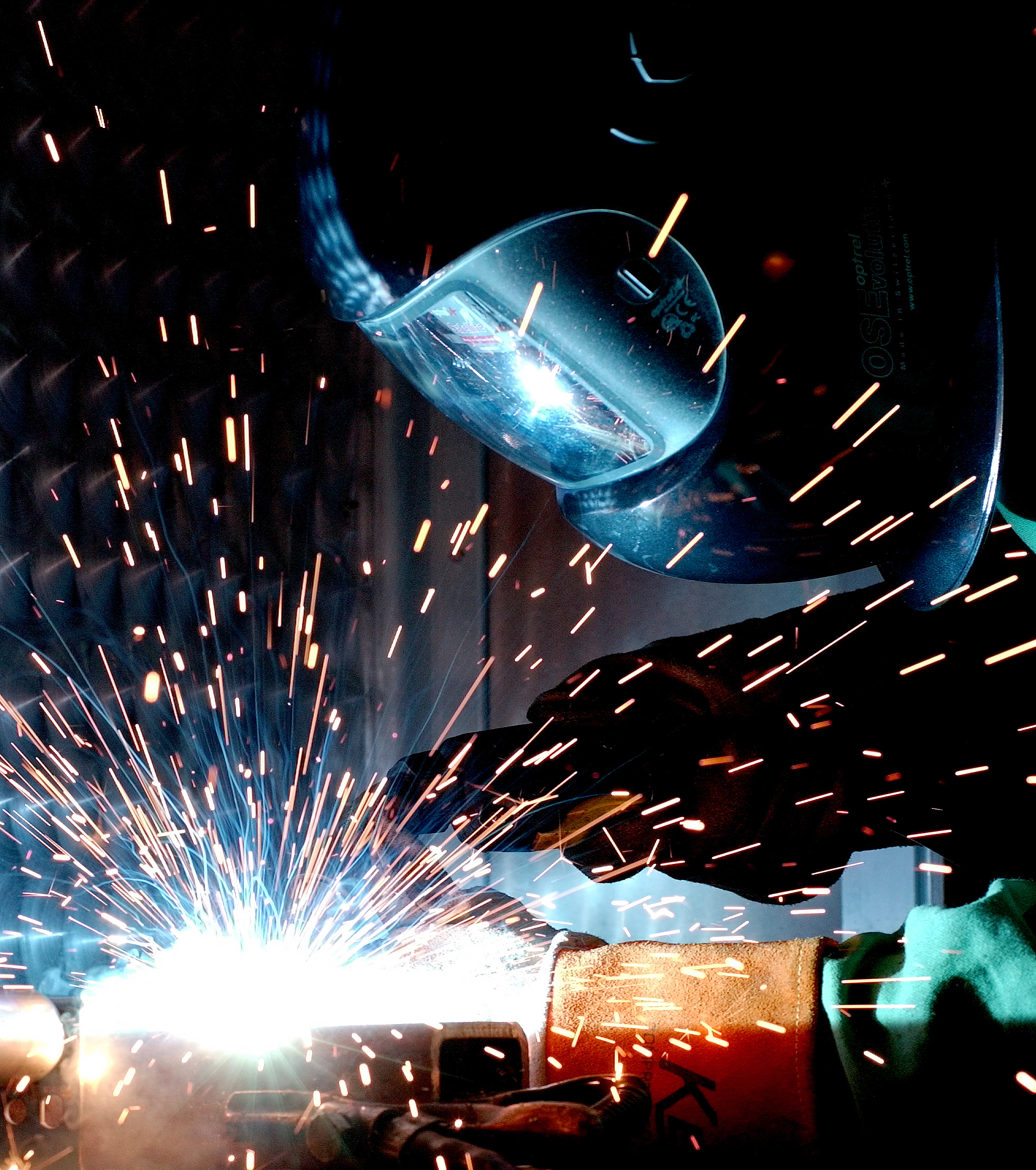
Mig welding

=== Welding ===
Welding is a fabrication process that joins materials, usually metals or thermoplastics, by causing coalescence. This is often done by melting the workpieces and adding a filler material to form a pool of molten material that cools to become a strong joint, but sometimes pressure is used in conjunction with heat, or by itself, to produce the weld.

Many different energy sources can be used for welding, including a gas flame, an electric arc, a laser, an electron beam, friction, and ultrasound. While often an industrial process, welding can be done in many different environments, including open air, underwater and in space. Regardless of location, however, welding remains dangerous, and precautions must be taken to avoid burns, electric shock, poisonous fumes, and overexposure to ultraviolet light.

=== Brazing ===
Brazing is a joining process in which a filler metal is melted and drawn into a capillary formed by the assembly of two or more work pieces. The filler metal reacts metallurgically with the workpieces and solidifies in the capillary, forming a strong joint. Unlike welding, the work piece is not melted. Brazing is similar to soldering, but occurs at temperatures in excess of 450 °C (842 °F). Brazing has the advantage of producing less thermal stresses than welding, and brazed assemblies tend to be more ductile than weldments because alloying elements can not segregate and precipitate.

Brazing techniques include, flame brazing, resistance brazing, furnace brazing, diffusion brazing, inductive brazing and vacuum brazing.

=== Soldering ===
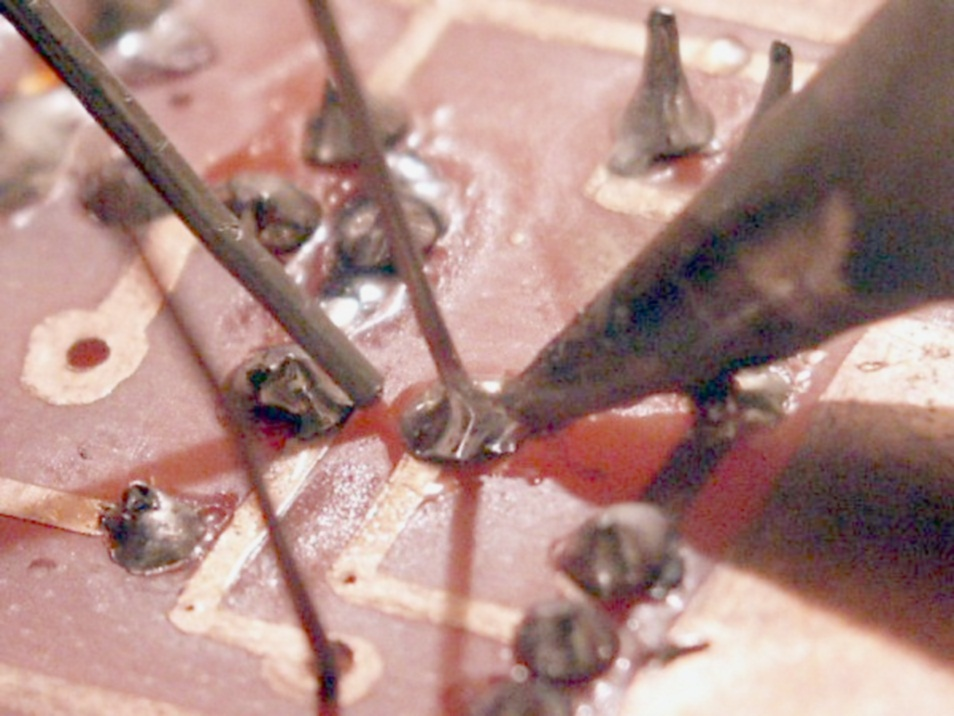
Soldering a printed circuit board

Soldering is a joining process that occurs at temperatures below 450 °C (842 °F). It is similar to brazing in the way that a filler is melted and drawn into a capillary to form a joint, although at a lower temperature. Because of this lower temperature and different alloys used as fillers, the metallurgical reaction between filler and work piece is minimal, resulting in a weaker joint.

=== Riveting ===
Riveting is one of the most ancient metalwork joining processes. Its use declined markedly during the second half of the 20th century, but it still retains important uses in industry and construction, and in artisan crafts such as jewellery, medieval armouring and metal couture in the early 21st century. The earlier use of rivets is being superseded by improvements in welding and component fabrication techniques.

A rivet is essentially a two-headed and unthreaded bolt which holds two other pieces of metal together. Holes are drilled or punched through the two pieces of metal to be joined. The holes being aligned, a rivet is passed through the holes and permanent heads are formed onto the ends of the rivet utilizing hammers and forming dies (by either cold working or hot working). Rivets are commonly purchased with one head already formed.

When it is necessary to remove rivets, one of the rivet's heads is sheared off with a cold chisel. The rivet is then driven out with a hammer and punch.

=== Mechanical fixings ===
This includes screws, as well as bolts. This is often used as it requires relatively little specialist equipment, and are therefore often used in flat-pack furniture. It can also be used when a metal is joined to another material (such as wood) or a particular metal does not weld well (such as aluminum). This can be done to directly join metals, or with an intermediate material such as nylon. While often weaker than other methods such as welding or brazing, the metal can easily be removed and therefore reused or recycled. It can also be done in conjunction with an epoxy or glue, reverting its ecological benefits.

== Associated processes ==
While these processes are not primary metalworking processes, they are often performed before or after metalworking processes.

=== Heat treatment ===
Metals can be heat treated to alter the properties of strength, ductility, toughness, hardness or resistance to corrosion. Common heat treatment processes include annealing, precipitation hardening, quenching, and tempering:

- annealing softens the metal by allowing recovery of cold work and grain growth.
- quenching can be used to harden alloy steels, or in precipitation hardenable alloys, to trap dissolved solute atoms in solution.
- tempering will cause the dissolved alloying elements to precipitate, or in the case of quenched steels, improve impact strength and ductile properties.

Often, mechanical and thermal treatments are combined in what is known as thermo-mechanical treatments for better properties and more efficient processing of materials. These processes are common to high alloy special steels, super alloys and titanium alloys.

=== Plating ===
Electroplating is a common surface-treatment technique. It involves bonding a thin layer of another metal such as gold, silver, chromium or zinc to the surface of the product by hydrolysis. It is used to reduce corrosion, create abrasion resistance and improve the product's aesthetic appearance. Plating can even change the properties of the original part including conductivity, heat dissipation or structural integrity. There are four main electroplating methods to ensure proper coating and cost effectiveness per product: mass plating, rack plating, continuous plating and line plating.

=== Thermal spraying ===
Thermal spraying techniques are another popular finishing option, and often have better high temperature properties than electroplated coatings due to the thicker coating. The four main thermal spray processes include electric wire arc spray, flame (oxy acetylene combustion) spray, plasma spray and high velocity oxy fuel (HVOF) spray.

== See also ==
- Bronze and brass ornamental work
- Chip formation
- Heavy metals
- Lead poisoning
- List of metalworking occupations
- Metal swarf
- Metal testing
- Metalworking hand tool
- Occupational dust exposure
- Particulates
- Power tool
- Stone mould

General:

- List of manufacturing processes
- Timeline of materials technology
