= Spiling (boat building) =

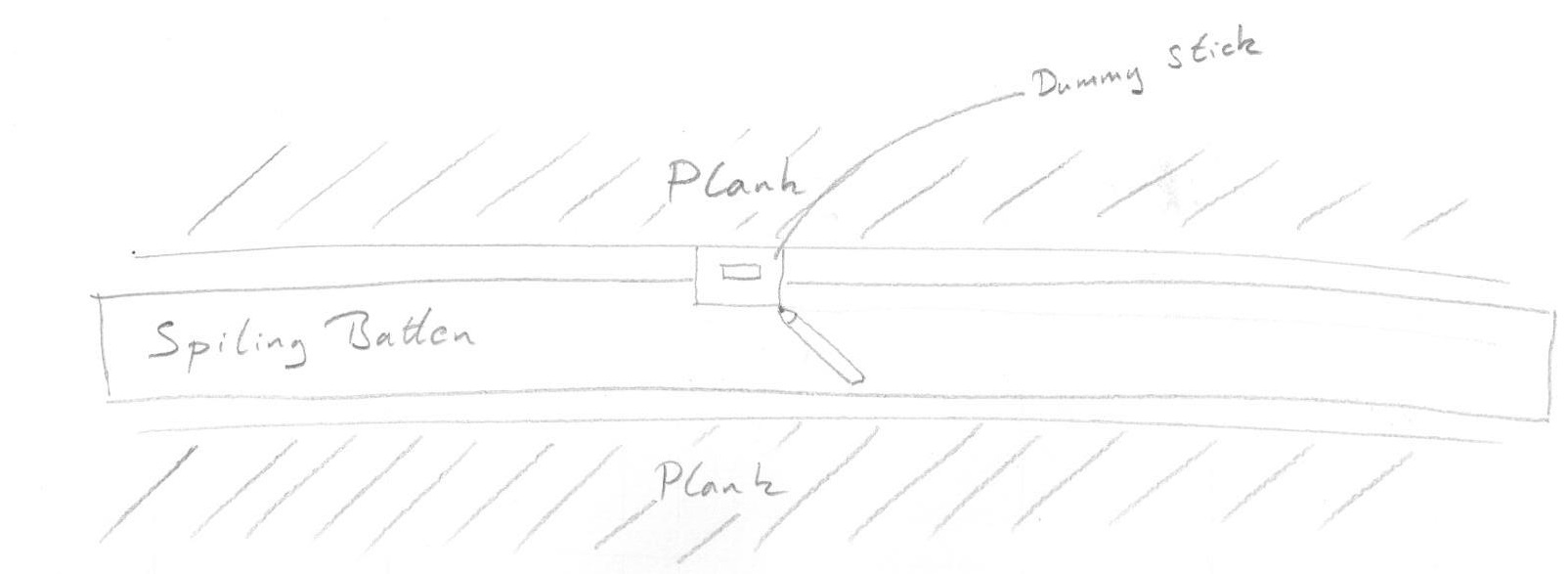
Spiling batten in use

Spiling is a technique used in building wooden boats in which a smaller component is used as a pattern against which the outline of a larger component can be drawn. This is often used for creating planks on traditionally built boats that have complex shapes.

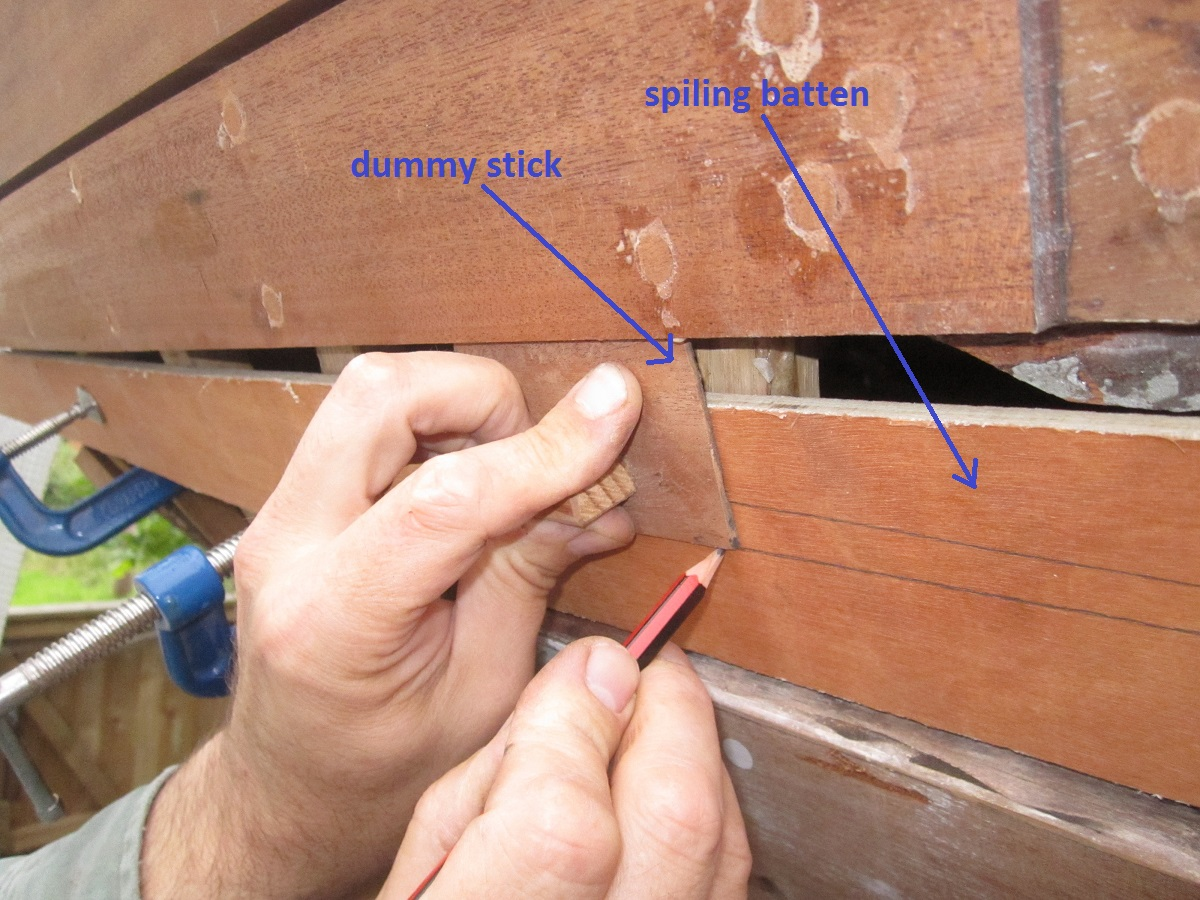
Spiling step 1 : transferring the shape from the hull onto the spiling batten using the dummy stick.

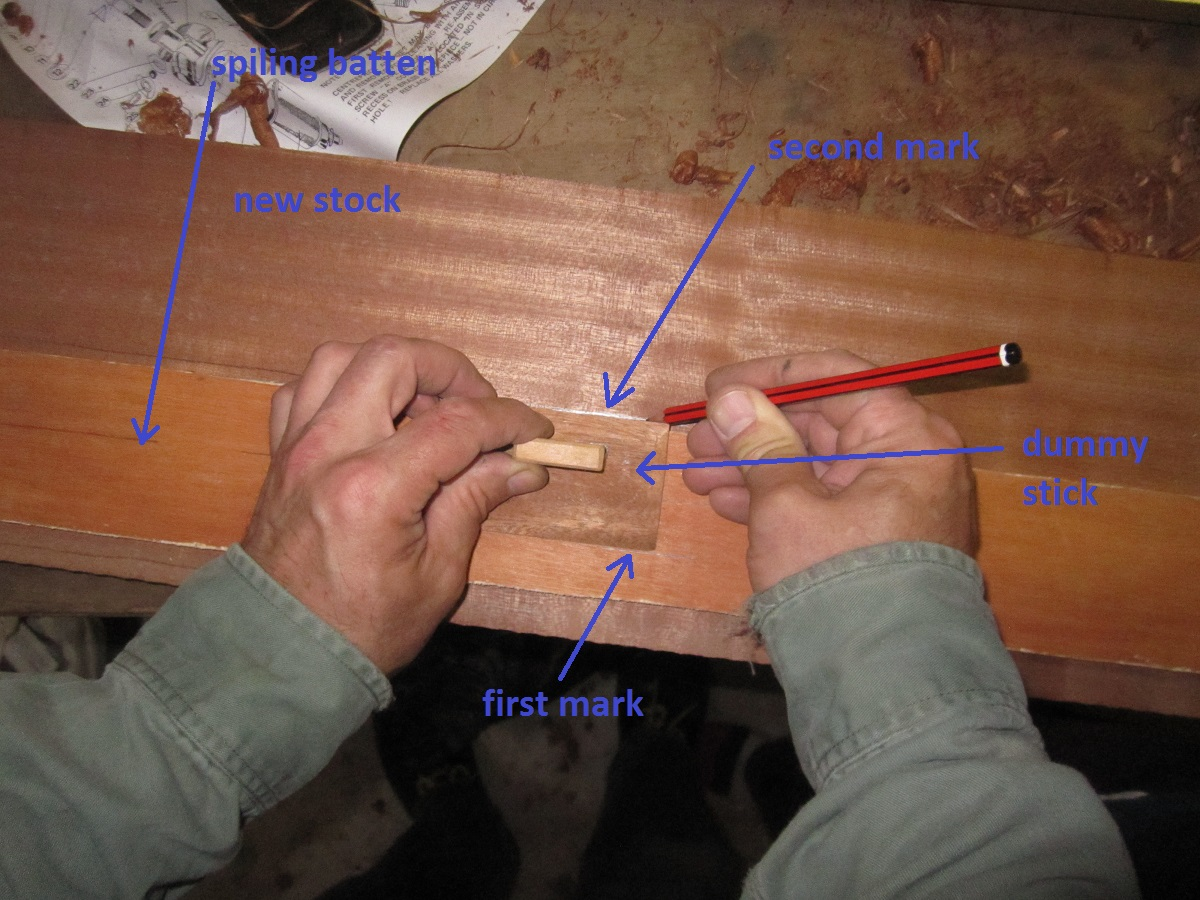
Spiling step 2 : transferring the shape from the spiling batten onto the new stock by following the mark on the spiling batten using the same dummy stick.

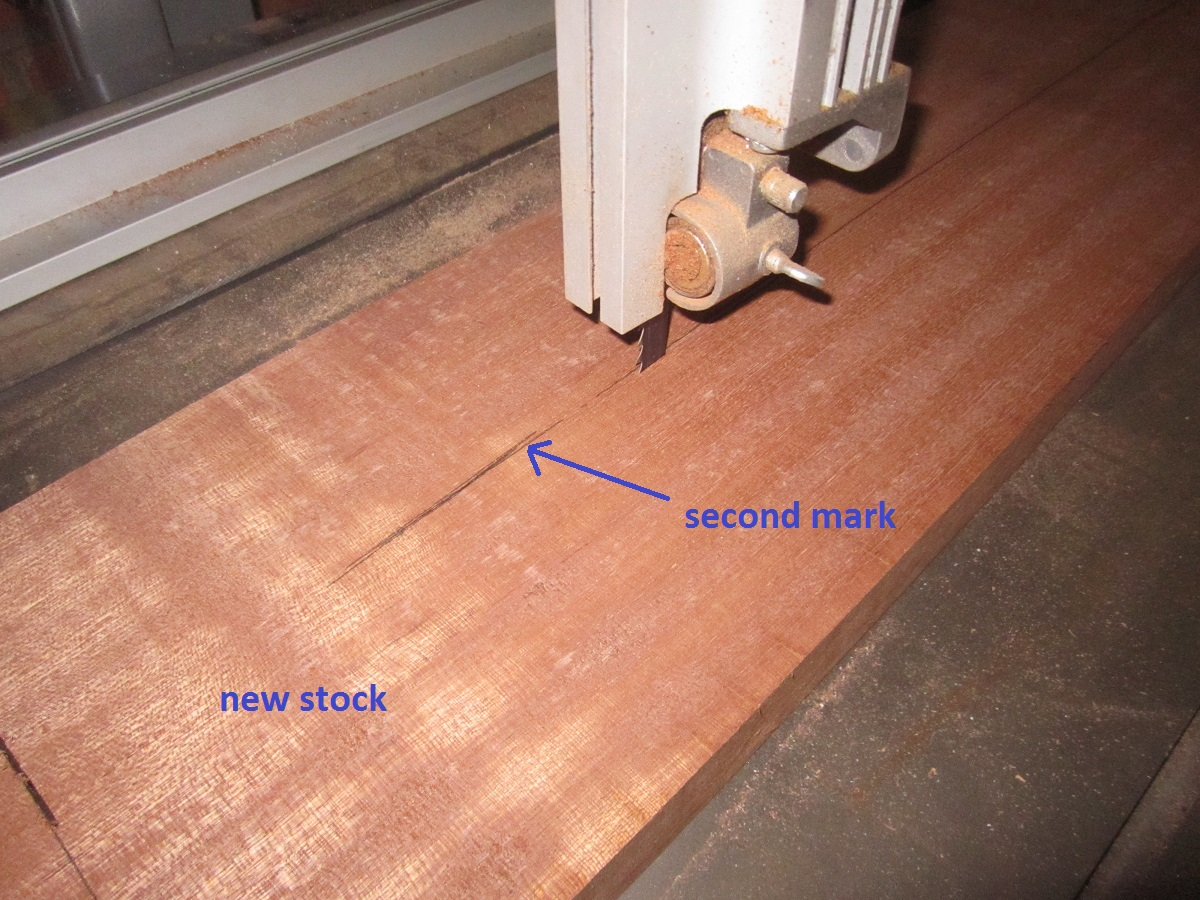
Spiling step 3 : cutting out the new plank following the mark made in step 2.

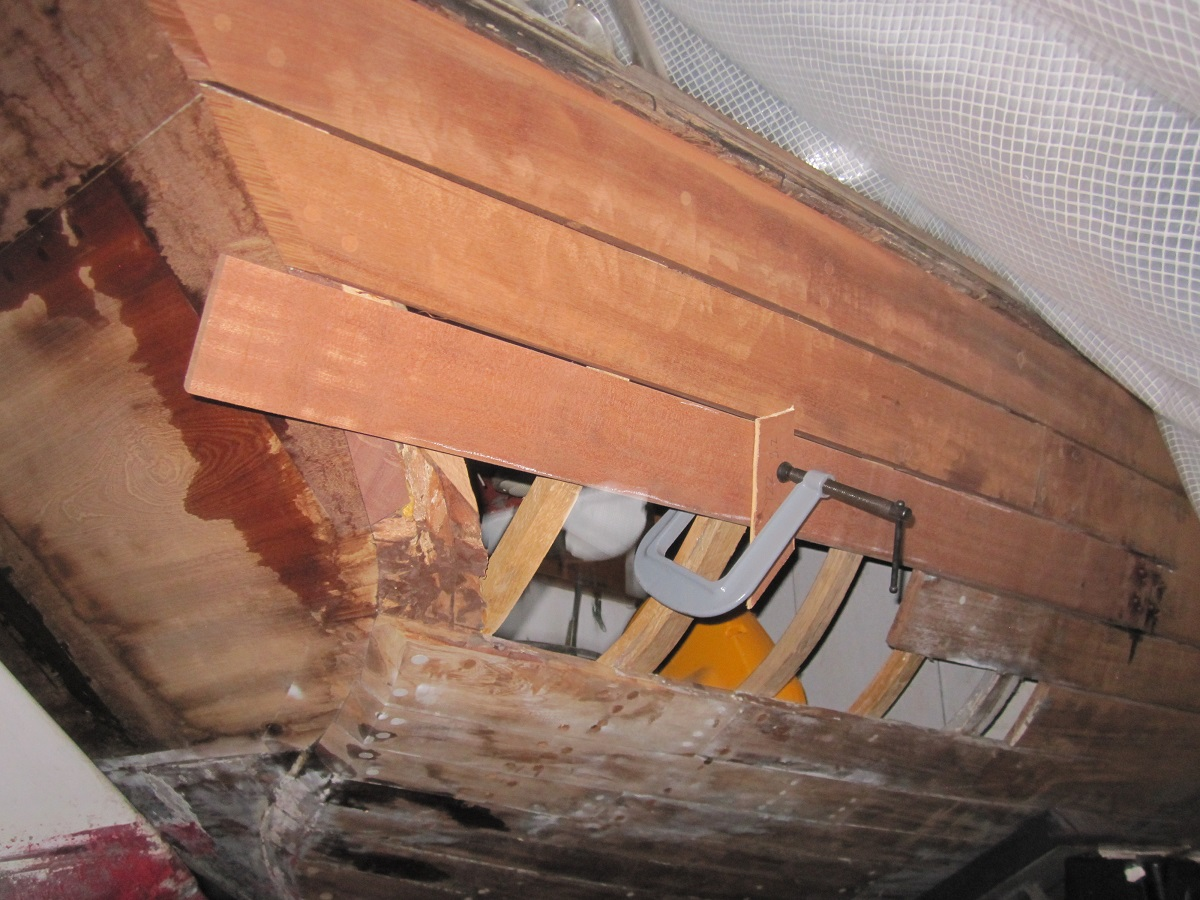
Spiling step 4 : new plank being fitted

When used for making a new plank for a boat a piece of timber the same length as the desired plank but both thinner and narrower is cut. This is called the spiling batten. This is then temporarily attached to the boat in the place of the plank required. The shape of the plank required can then be traced onto the spiling batten using a compass, or a dummy stick. The spiling batten can then be lifted out and placed on the new stock, and moved around to find the optimum use of the stock material, then using the same compass or dummy stick, the exact shape required can be traced off the spiling batten onto the new stock, ready to be cut out.

When spiling a complex shape curved in more than one direction, it is important to keep the dummy stick in the same orientation, and not allow it to follow the curve, otherwise a distortion of the shape will result. The shapes of boats' planks are complex as the plank gets wider to cover the broader midships and then narrower as the planks converge towards the bow and the stern. A curved line on a flat surface will be a straight line on a curved surface. This process enables more complex shapes to be built in wood than in sheet metalworking for example, would require stretching by hammer/mallet and sandbag or the use of an English Wheel.
