= Raising (metalworking) =

Metalworking technique

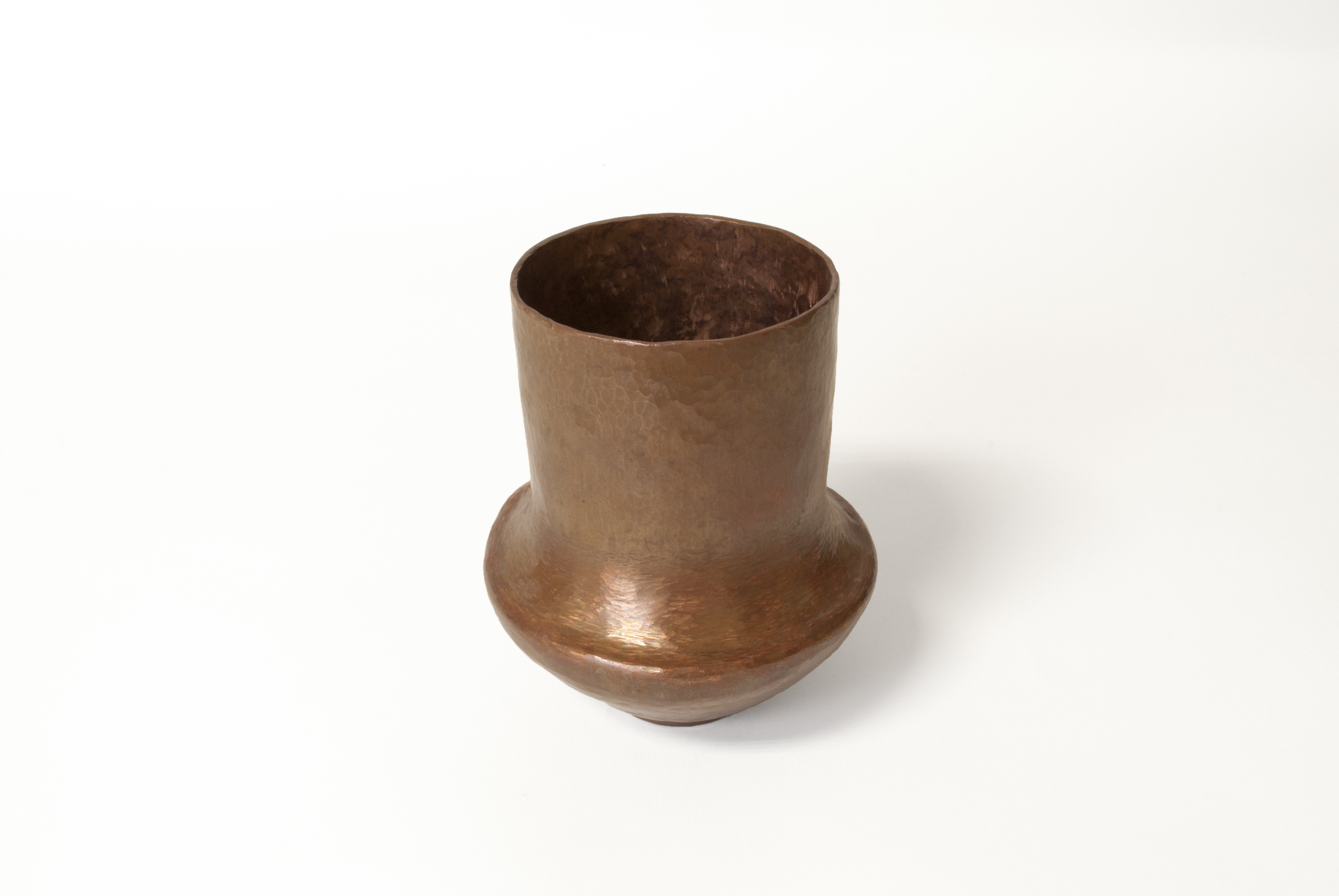
A copper vase formed using the process of raising

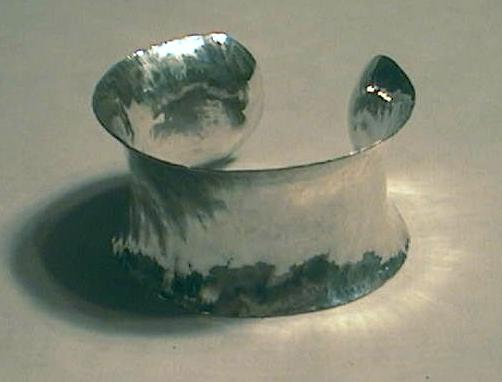
Anticlastic forged sterling bracelet

Raising is a metalworking technique whereby sheet metal is formed over a solid object by repeated "courses" of hammering and annealing. A sheet metal worker is often required to raise, or bump, the work into form from the flat metal by means of a raising hammer and raising block. The raising block is made from substance giving resistance to the blows.

A modern term is synclastic raising, the dominant curves of the object being forged are at right angles and move in the same direction; as in a bowl. This results in a surface possessing elliptic geometry.

Anticlastic raising, on the other hand, refers to shaping an object where the dominant axes move in opposite directions; a familiar example of this is a potato crisp. This results in a surface possessing hyperbolic geometry.

== See also ==
- Planishing
- Sinking (metalworking)

== Bibliography ==
- Finegold, Rupert and William Seitz. Silversmithing. Krause; 1983. ISBN 0-8019-7232-9
