= Metal spinning =

Metalworking process

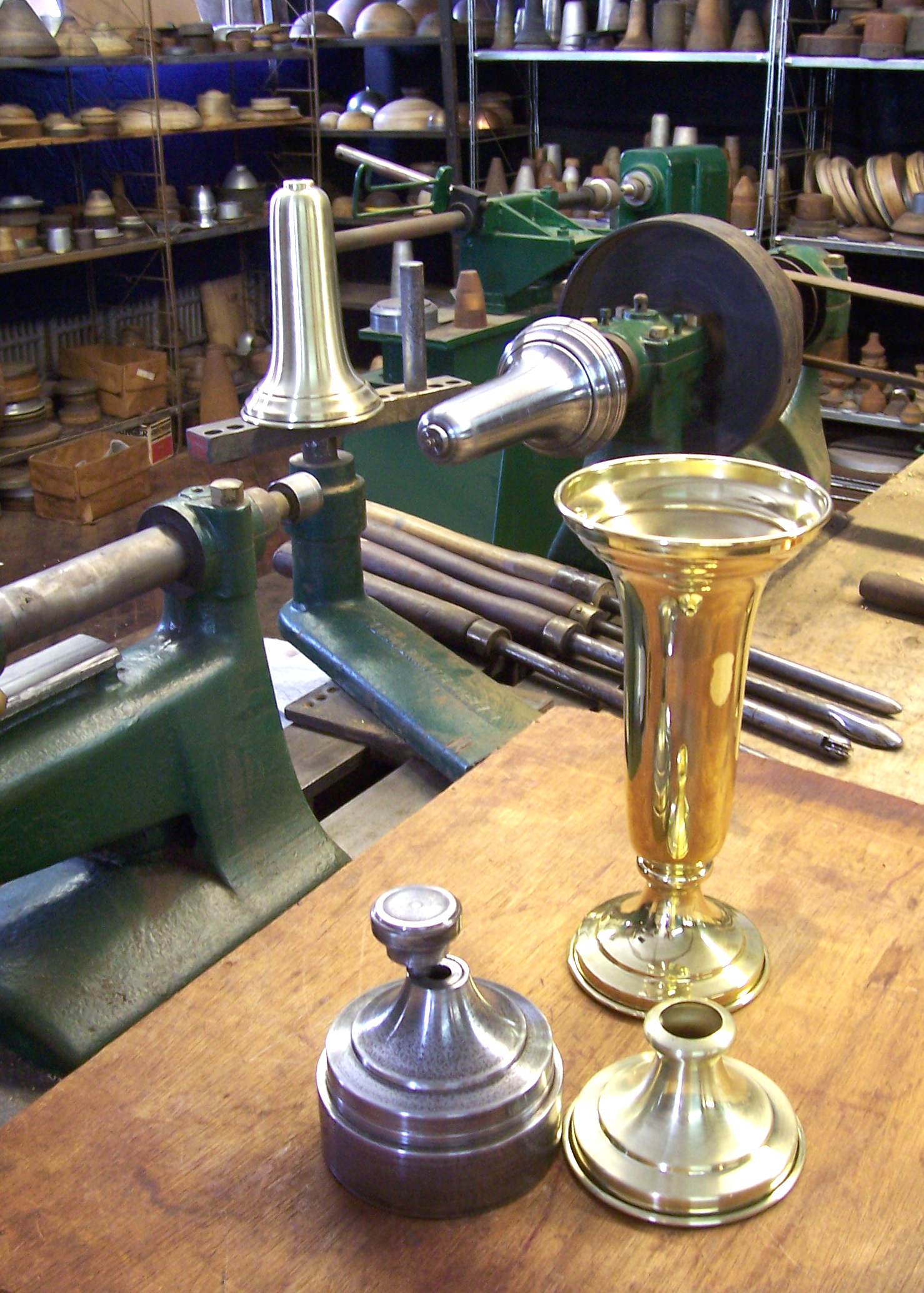
A brass vase spun by hand. Mounted to the lathe spindle is the mandrel for the body of the vase; a shell sits on the "T" rest. The foreground shows the mandrel for the base. Behind the finished vase are the spinning tools used to shape the metal.

Metal spinning, also known as spin forming or spinning or metal turning most commonly, is a metalworking process by which a disc or tube of metal is rotated at high speed and formed into an axially symmetric part. Spinning can be performed by hand or by a CNC lathe.

The metal spinning trade is one that dates back to antiquity and was a skill used in the Ancient Egyptian era. This is when metal spinning was limited to soft metals spun by human power on primitive lathes. The technique gave significant advances to hydro and steam power in Europe and North America in the 19th century and by the early 20th century the electric motor provided the necessary power and high-speed turning capability. With this advancement, metal spinning craftsmen could spin higher quality pieces of brass, copper, aluminum and even stainless and cold-rolled steel.

Metal spinning does not involve removal of material, as in conventional wood or metal turning, but forming (moulding) of sheet metal over an existing shape.

Metal spinning ranges from an artisan's specialty to the most advantageous way to form round metal parts for commercial applications. Artisans use the process to produce architectural detail, specialty lighting, decorative household goods and urns. Commercial applications include rocket nose cones, cookware, gas cylinders, brass instrument bells, and public waste receptacles. Virtually any ductile metal may be formed, from aluminum or stainless steel, to high-strength, high-temperature alloys including INX, Inconel, Grade 50 / Corten, and Hastelloy. The diameter and depth of formed parts are limited only by the size of the equipment available.

== Process ==
The spinning process is fairly simple. A formed block is mounted in the drive section of a lathe. A pre-sized metal disk is then clamped against the block by a pressure pad, which is attached to the tailstock. The block and workpiece are then rotated together at high speeds. A localized force is then applied to the workpiece to cause it to flow over the block. The force is usually applied via various levered tools. Simple workpieces are just removed from the block, but more complex shapes may require a multi-piece block. Extremely complex shapes can be spun over ice forms, which then melt away after spinning. Because the final diameter of the workpiece is always less than the starting diameter, the workpiece must thicken, elongate radially, or buckle circumferentially.

A more involved process, known as reducing or necking, allows a spun workpiece to include reentrant geometries. If surface finish and form are not critical, then the workpiece is "spun on air"; no mandrel is used. If the finish or form are critical then an eccentrically mounted mandrel is used.

"Hot spinning" involves spinning a piece of metal on a lathe while high heat from a torch is applied to the workpiece. Once heated, the metal is then shaped as the tool on the lathe presses against the heated surface forcing it to distort as it spins. Parts can then be shaped or necked down to a smaller diameter with little force exerted, providing a seamless shoulder.

=== Tools ===
The basic hand metal spinning tool is called a spoon, though many other tools (be they commercially produced, ad hoc, or improvised) can be used to effect varied results. Spinning tools can be made of hardened steel for use with aluminum, or from solid brass for spinning stainless steel or mild steel.

Some metal spinning tools are allowed to spin on bearings during the forming process. This reduces friction and heating of the tool, extending tool life and improving surface finish. Rotating tools may also be coated with a thin film of ceramic to prolong tool life. Rotating tools are commonly used during CNC metal spinning operations.

Commercially, rollers mounted on the end of levers are generally used to form the material down to the mandrel in both hand spinning and CNC metal spinning. Rollers vary in diameter and thickness depending the intended use. The wider the roller the smoother the surface of the spinning; the thinner rollers can be used to form smaller radii.

Cutting of the metal is done by hand held cutters, often foot long hollow bars with tool steel shaped/sharpened files attached. In CNC applications, carbide or tool steel cut-off tools are used.

The mandrel does not incur excessive forces, as found in other metalworking processes, so it can be made from wood, plastic, or ice. For hard materials or high volume use, the mandrel is usually made of metal.

== Advantages and disadvantages ==
Several operations can be performed in one set-up. Work pieces may have re-entrant profiles and the profile in relation to the center line virtually unrestricted.

Forming parameters and part geometry can be altered quickly, at less cost than other metal forming techniques. Tooling and production costs are also comparatively low. Spin forming, often done by hand, is easily automated and an effective production method for prototypes as well as high quantity production runs.

Other methods of forming round metal parts include hydroforming, stamping, forging and casting. These other methods generally have a higher fixed cost, but a lower variable cost than metal spinning. As machinery for commercial applications has improved, parts are being spun with thicker materials in excess of 1in (25mm) thick steel. Conventional spinning also wastes a considerably smaller amount of material than other methods.

Objects can be built using one piece of material to produce parts without seams. Without seams, a part can withstand higher internal or external pressure exerted on it. For example: scuba tanks and CO_{2} cartridges.

One disadvantage of metal spinning is that if a crack forms or the object is dented, it must be scrapped. Repairing the object is not cost-effective.

== See also ==
- Curling (metalworking)
- Shear spinning
