= Planishing =

Metalworking technique

Diagram of planishing, showing planishing hammer, workpiece, and planishing stake (hammer not to scale)

Planishing (from the Latin planus, "flat") is a metalworking technique that involves finishing the surface of sheet metal by finely shaping and smoothing it.

== Process ==
A metal surface is finished by hammering it with a planishing panel hammer or slapper file against a shaped surface called a planishing stake that is held in a vise or a mounting hole in a blacksmith's beak anvil, or against hand-held, shaped, metal tools that are known as dollies or anvils. The shape of the stake or dolly has to match the desired work piece contour, and so they come in a variety of complex shapes. Alternatively, planishing may be done by the use of an English wheel. After approximately forming a metal object, by stretching with techniques such as sinking and raising, and then shaping and smoothing an object, metal workers use planishing for surface finishing. Planishing is a hand-driven process used in auto body repair and sheet metal craft work such as medieval armour production.

== Tools ==
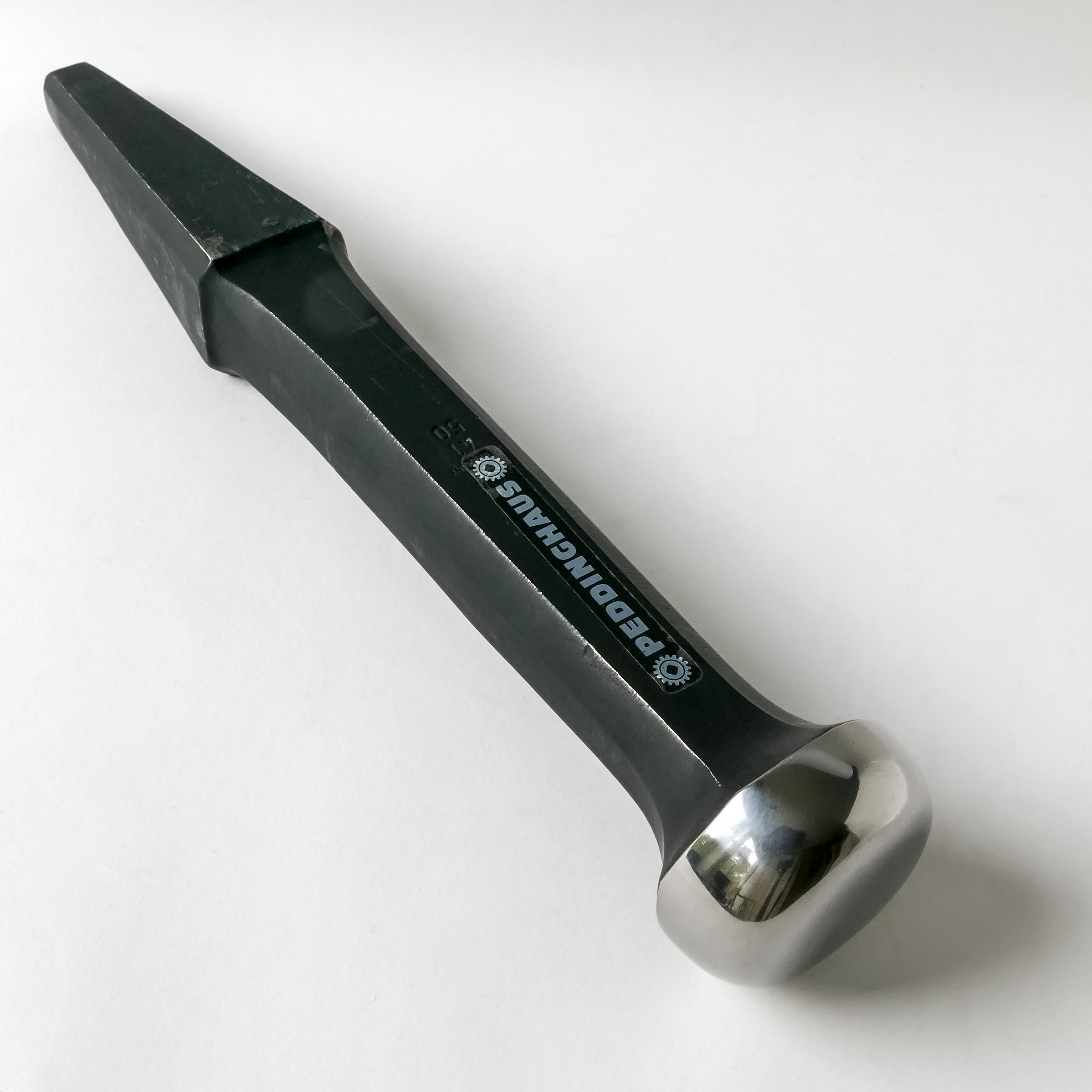
Polished Peddinghaus round face semi-domed socket stake for metal shaping.

Common tools used for planishing include panel beating hammers, slappers, and neck hammers. Heavy rawhide or hardwood hammers are often used. It is more difficult to make mistakes with heavy rawhide or wood mallets, but they are less effective for large imperfections. A worker, using repeated, relatively soft glancing blows, smooths the metal toward the curvature of the stake. If the metal begins to look dimpled, the worker is using too much force in individual hammer blows.

== Features ==
Since planishing hammers are generally in contact with the outside surface of the piece, they are flat, have rounded edges and are polished to avoid marring the work. Pneumatic (air powered) planishing hammers strike hundreds of blows per minute.

Care must be taken not to allow sheet metal to harden and become brittle during planishing. If it does, it must be annealed.
