= Superforming =

Superforming is a hot metal forming process that uses similar principles to thermoforming plastics, where a sheet of material is heated and forced onto a male or female form using gas pressure. The process is useful for producing complex surfaces. The technique was pioneered for use in alloy fighter jets, with a sheet of aluminum heated like "taffy" and then "blown" into a mold by a press system, allowing complex curves. It heats the sheets to 500 degrees Celsius, and after molding, vacuums out the air.

== Use in transportation ==
The Jaguar I-Pace was the world's first structure to be made with superforming. In 2015, McLaren announced that the 570S Coupe used superformed aluminum body panels. The first Morgan Aero GTs released in 2018 used the process. According to Bentley, the third-generation 2018 Bentley Continental GT is the first production car ever to have an entire body side made from the Super Formed process. The panels are "superformed" with heated aluminum sheets molded by gas instead of a stamp. In particular, the fenders, hood, and doors are superformed.

== Variations in process ==
The superforming process varies mostly in the way that the metal is introduced to the form; the main 4 variations are:

Cavity forming
The metal in its plastic state is introduced to a negative form by gas pressure. It is good for large and complex parts such as automotive body panels and is excellent for shaping 5083 aluminium alloy.
Backpressure forming
The metal in its plastic state is introduced to a negative mould by gas pressure similarly to cavity forming; however, the pressure differential between the front and back of the metal is kept small and within tight tolerances. This maintains the integrity of the sheet and means that "difficult" alloys can be formed. It was developed to produce structural aircraft components in 7475 alloys.
Bubble forming
The metal in its plastic state is first expanded into a bubble with gas pressure; a positive form is then moved into the bubble cavity and the metal introduced to the form with reverse gas pressure. Suitable for deep complex components, especially where wall thickness needs to remain relatively constant. This process can be used to manufacture geometries that are impossible to achieve using any other forming process.
Diaphragm forming
A non-superplastic metal is introduced to a negative form by a superplastic metal which is itself being moved by gas pressure. It is used to shape complex sheet geometries in non-superplastics alloys such as 2014, 2024, 2219 and 6061. making the process ideal for producing structural components.

Superforming process is used to create complex sheet geometries from a single piece of material and this process has been rapidly growing in many applications, including aerospace, automotive, buildings, trains, electronics, furniture and sculpture.
