= Sinking (metalworking) =

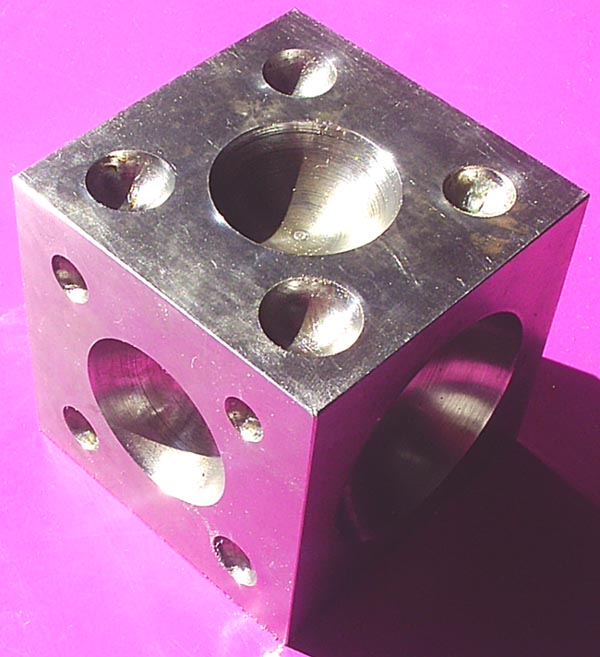
Steel doming block

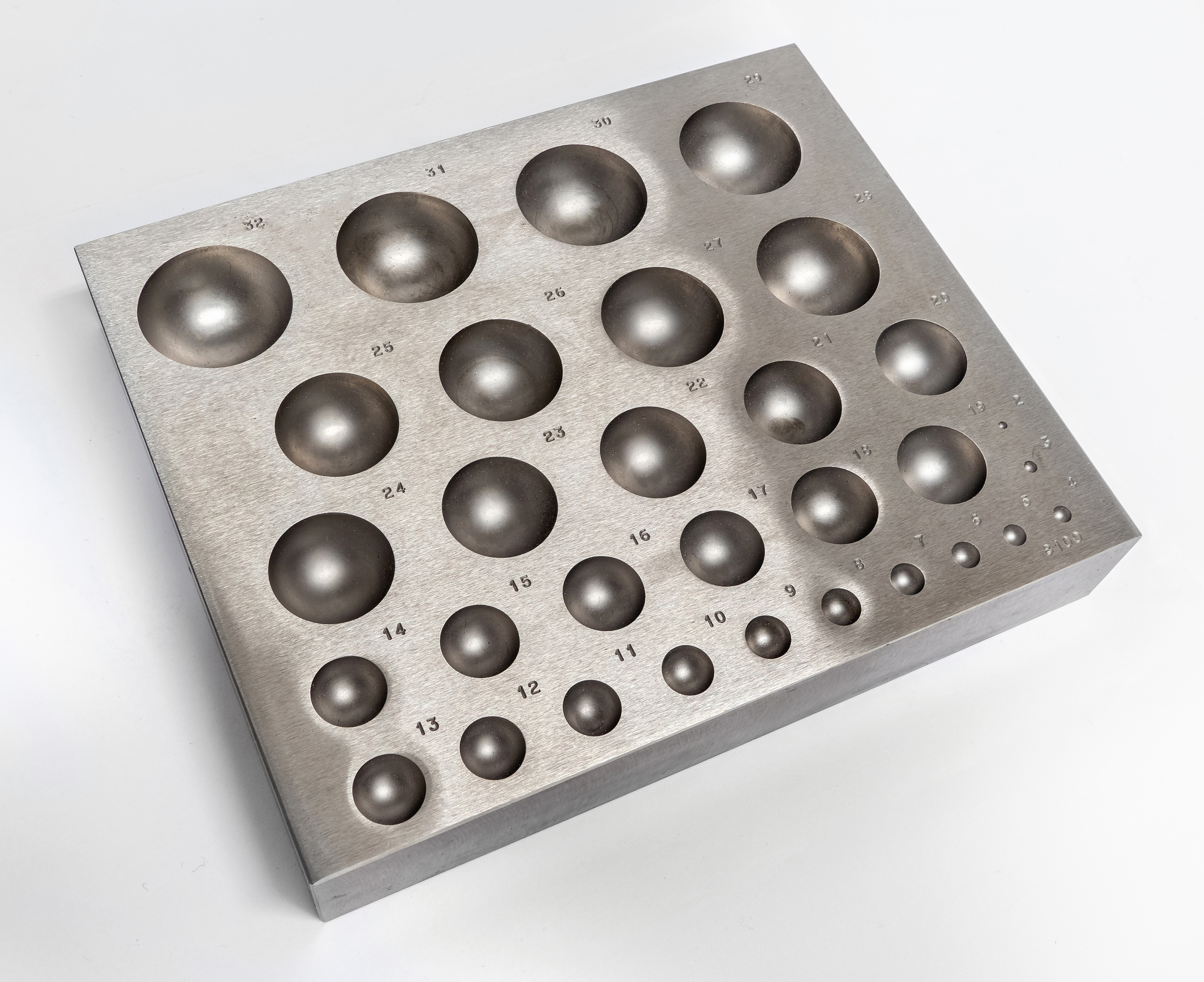
Flat steel doming block

Sinking, also known as doming, dishing or dapping, is a metalworking technique whereby flat sheet metal is formed into a non-flat object by hammering it into a concave indentation. While sinking is a relatively fast method, it results in stretching and therefore thinning the metal, risking failure of the metal if it is "sunk" too far.

Sinking is used in the manufacture of many items, from jewellery to plate armour.

== See also ==
- Planishing
