= Shear forming =

Metalworking process

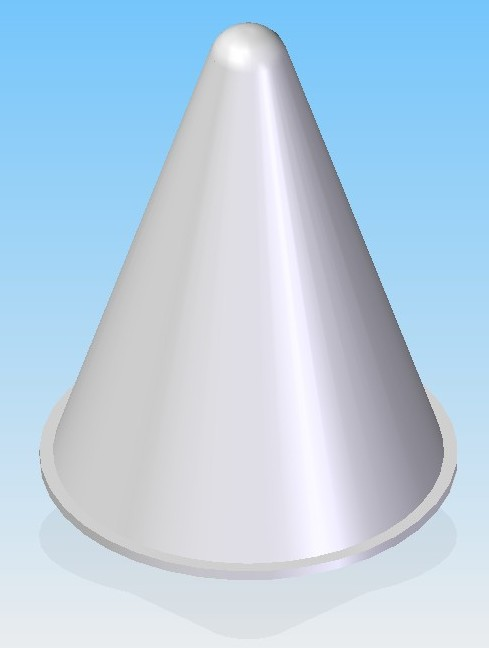
Fig. 1. A shear formed product: a hollow cone with a thin wall thickness

Shear forming (shear spinning), is similar to metal spinning. In shear spinning, the area of the final piece is approximately equal to that of the flat sheet metal blank. The wall thickness is maintained by controlling the gap between the roller and the mandrel. In shear forming, a reduction of the wall thickness occurs.

Before the 1950s, spinning was performed on a turning lathe. When powered dedicated spinning machines became available, shear forming started to develop in Sweden.

== Schematics ==
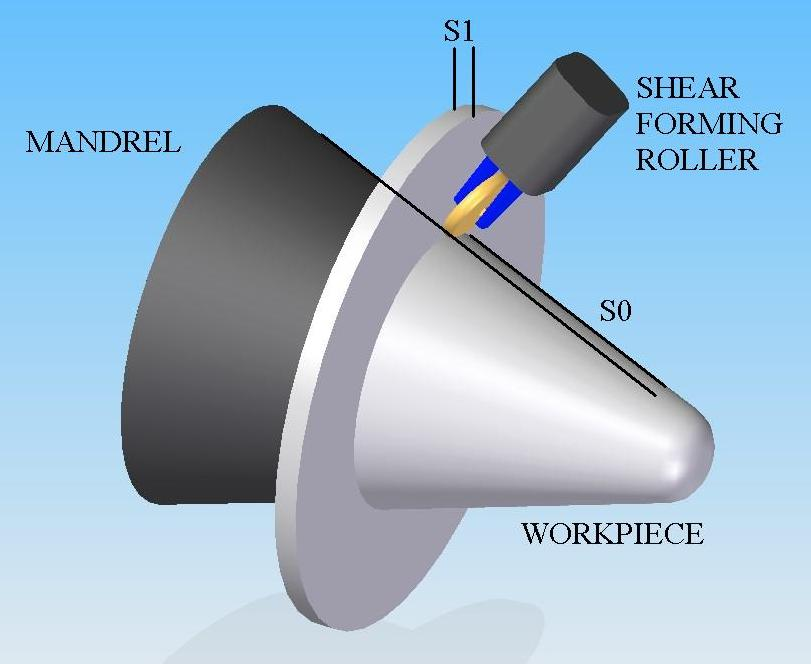
Fig. 2. Shear forming schematics. S1 is the initial wall thickness of the workpiece, which is reduced to S0.

Figure 2 shows the schematics of a shear forming process.

- A sheet metal blank is placed between the mandrel and the chuck of the spinning machine. The mandrel has the interior shape of the desired final component.
- A roller makes the sheet metal wrap the mandrel so that it takes its shape.

== Workpiece and roller tool profiles ==
In shear forming, the starting workpiece can have circular or rectangular cross sections. The profile shape of the final component can be concave, convex or some combination.

A shear-forming machine looks like a conventional spinning machine, except that it has to withstand the higher forces necessary to perform the shearing operation.

The design of the roller must be considered carefully, because it affects the shape of the component, the wall thickness, and dimensional accuracy. The smaller the tool nose radius, the higher the stresses and the lower the thickness uniformity achieved.

== Spinnability ==
Spinnability, sometimes called shear spinnability, can be defined as the ability of a metal to undergo shear spinning deformation without exceeding its tensile strength and tearing.

Kegg predicted that for materials with a tensile reduction of 80%, the limiting spinning reduction will be equal or greater than 80%. For metals with a true fracture strain of 0.5 or greater, the shear forming reduction has a limit. For materials with a true strain below 0.5, the spinnability depends on the material's ductility.

Highly spinnable materials include ductile materials such as aluminum and certain steel alloys.

== Significance ==
Shear forming and conventional spinning are used less than other manufacturing processes such as deep drawing and ironing. It can achieve thin sectioned parts of almost any shape, leading to its wide use in the production of lightweight items. Other advantages of shear spinning include the good mechanical properties of the final item and smooth surface finish.

Typical components produced by mechanically powered spinning machines include rocket nose cones, gas turbine engine parts, and dish aerials.

== Flow forming ==
Flow forming is an incremental metal-forming technique in which a disk or tube of metal is formed over a mandrel by one or more rollers using tremendous pressure. The roller deforms the workpiece, forcing it against the mandrel, both axially lengthening and radially thinning it. Since the pressure exerted by the roller is localized and the material is incrementally formed, net savings in energy may be achieved in forming over drawing or ironing processes. However, these savings are often not realized because of the inherent difficulties in predicting the specific deformation for a given roller path. Flow forming subjects the workpiece to enormous friction and deformation. These two factors may heat the workpiece to several hundred degrees if proper cooling techniques are not utilized.

Flow forming is common in wheel manufacturing and can be used to draw a wheel to net width from a machined blank.

During flow forming, the workpiece is cold worked, changing its mechanical properties, so its strength approaches that of forged metal.
