= Metal testing =

Metal testing is a process or procedure used to check composition of an unknown metallic substance. There are destructive processes and nondestructive processes. Metal testing can also include, determining the properties of newly forged metal alloys. With many chemical-property databases readily available, identification of unmarked pure, common metals can be a quick and easy process. Leaving the original sample in complete, re-usable condition. This type of testing is nondestructive. When working with alloys (forged mixtures) of metals however, to determine the exact composition, could result in the original sample being separated into its starting materials, then measured and calculated. After the components are known they can be looked up and matched to known alloys. The original sample would be destroyed in the process. This type of testing is destructive.

== Destructive testing (DT) ==
In this kind of testing, the material undergoes mechanical testing and is discarded thereafter. Test results are compared with specifications. Subtypes include:

- Bend test
- Impact test – Further categorised as Charpy test and Izod test
- Hardness test
- Tensile test
- Fatigue test
- Corrosion resistance test
- Wear test

== Nondestructive testing (NDT) ==
Raw and finished material undergoes testing according to code specifications such as ASME Boiler and Pressure Vessel Code Section V. The tested material is not damaged by the test. Subtypes include:

- Visual testing
- Dye penetrant inspection
- Magnetic particle inspection
- Radiographic testing
- Ultrasonic testing
- Leak testing
- Eddy current testing
- Remote field electromagnetic testing
- LR UT

== See also ==
- Metallurgical assay
