= Yemenite silversmithing =

Silvercraft of the Jews of Yemen

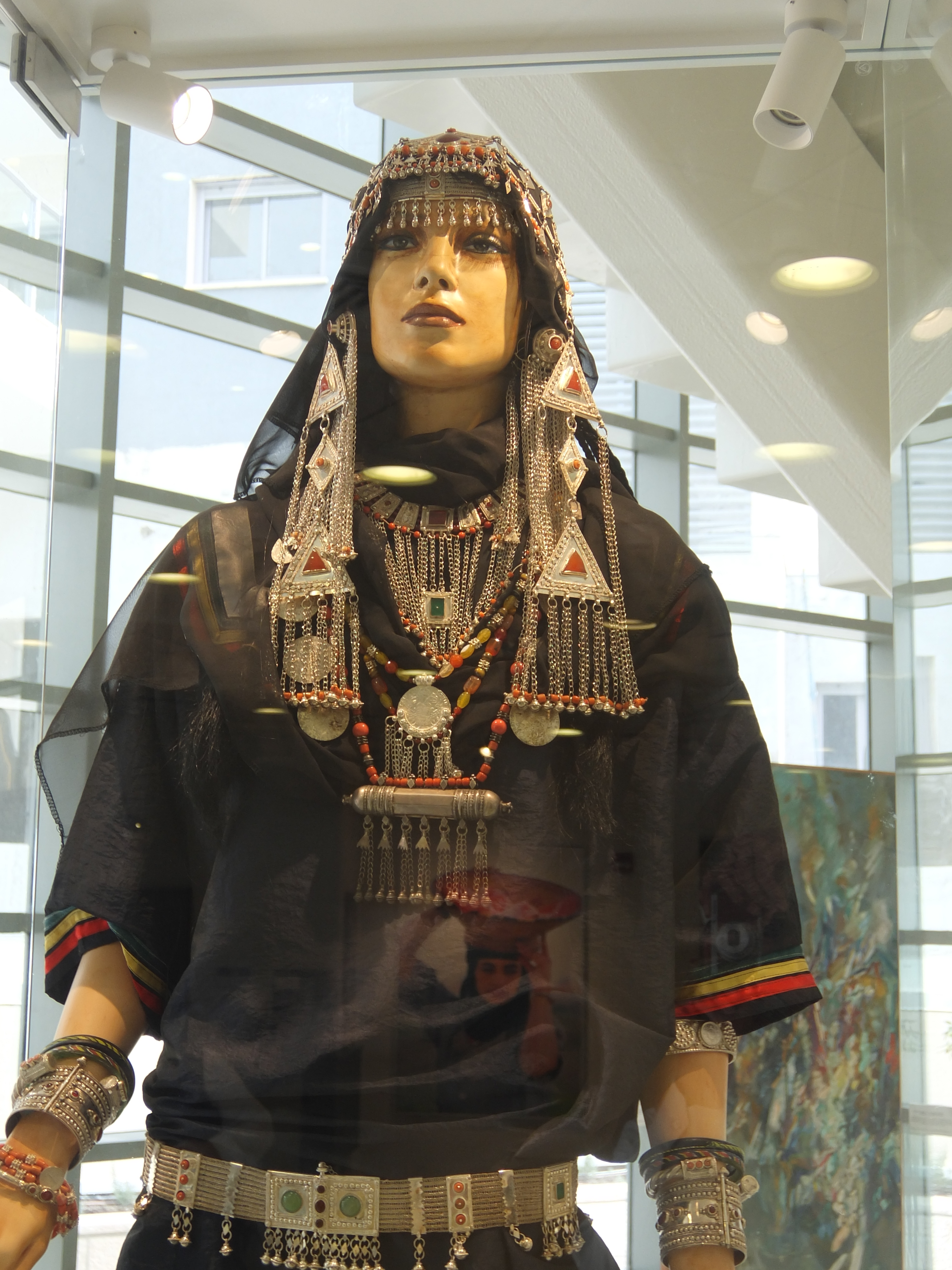
Mannequin with traditional Jewish Yemeni silver jewellery at the Yemenite Heritage Center, Rehovot, Israel

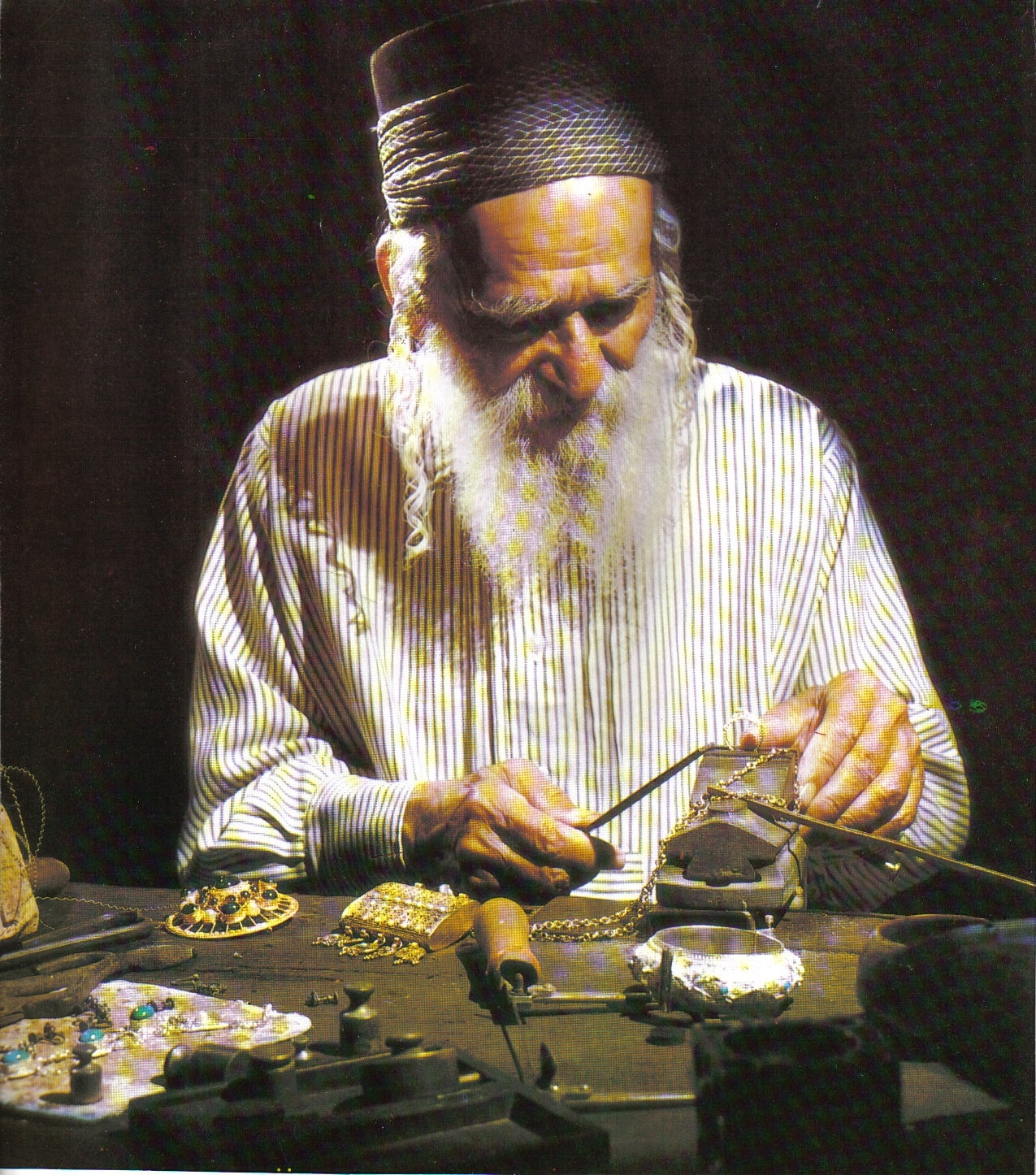
Silversmith, Yosef Salah (1888–1999)

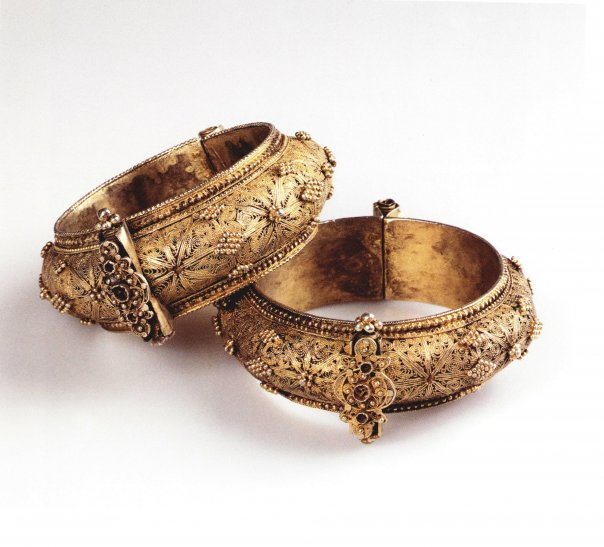
Silver bracelets, early 20th century

Yemenite silversmithing refers to the work of Jewish silversmiths from Yemen. They were highly acclaimed craftsmen who dominated craft production in precious metals in the southern Arabian peninsula from at least the 18th through the mid-20th century, a period and region during which Muslims did not engage in this work. These Yemenite silversmiths were noted for their skilled use of fine granulation and filigree, producing ornaments such as women's bracelets, necklaces, finials, as well as elaborate scabbard sheaths for men's daggers (janbīya).

== History ==
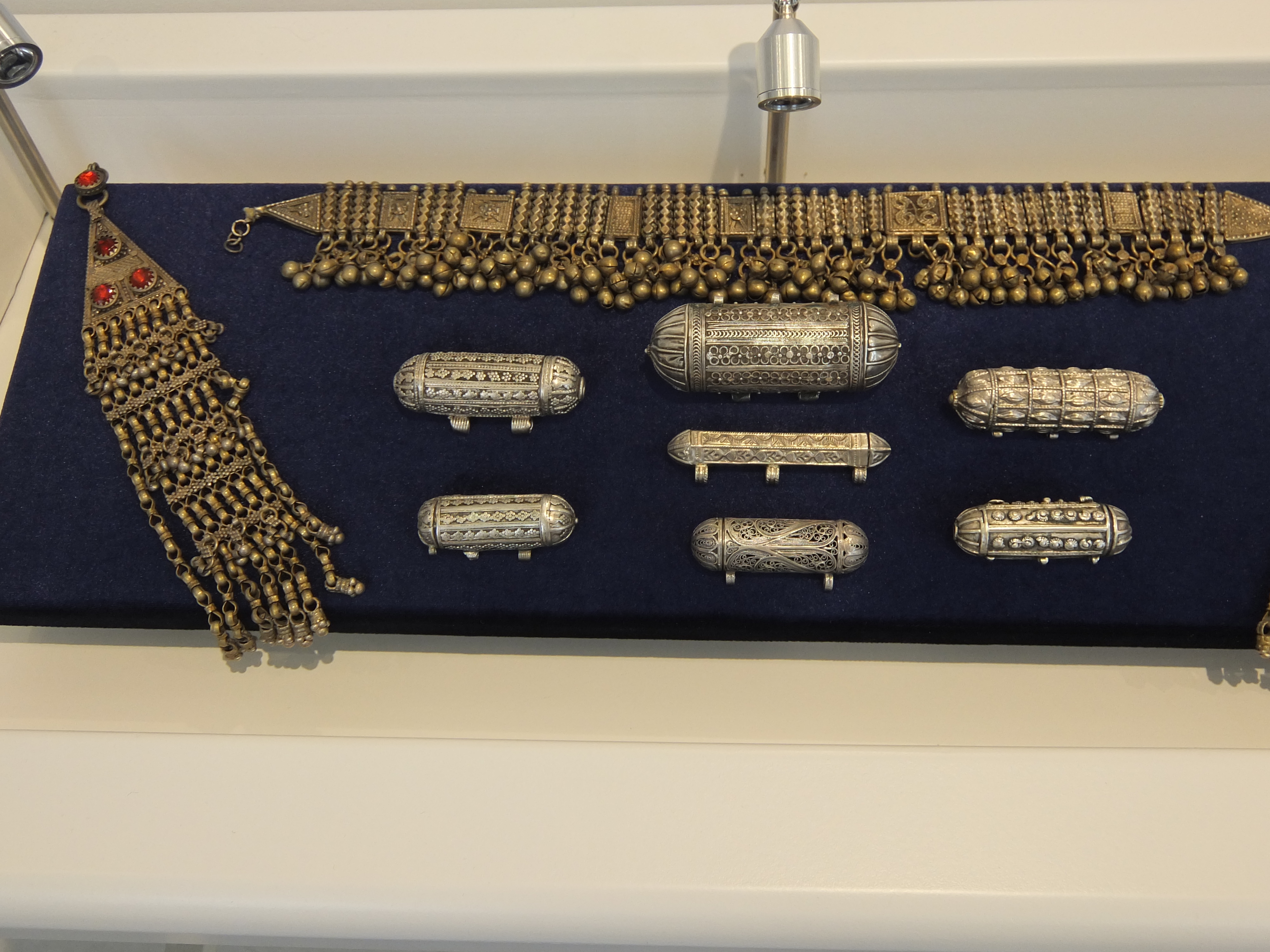
Showcase of silver craft

Yemenite silversmiths, a trade held almost exclusively by Jews living in the traditional Yemeni society, were active from at least as far back as the mid-1700s. The largest clientele for jewellery made of gold and silver were women, and the amount of jewellery worn was often an indicator of the woman's status. Some Yemenite silversmiths migrated to Palestine in the late 1800s, a migration that continued in the early 1900s. In the early 20th century, the Bezalel Academy of Arts and Design employed many Yemenites in the production of fine silver jewellery.

Between June 1949 and September 1950, almost the entire Jewish community in Yemen, including nearly every silversmith in the country, immigrated to Israel in an airborne mass migration known as Operation Magic Carpet. Muslims appear to have entered silversmithing in Yemen in the mid-1900s, as Yemenite Jews departed for Israel. Mass-produced gold and silver jewellery began to be imported into the Yemen in the 1930s, and dominated the market by the end of the 20th century, causing traditional silversmithing to dwindle.

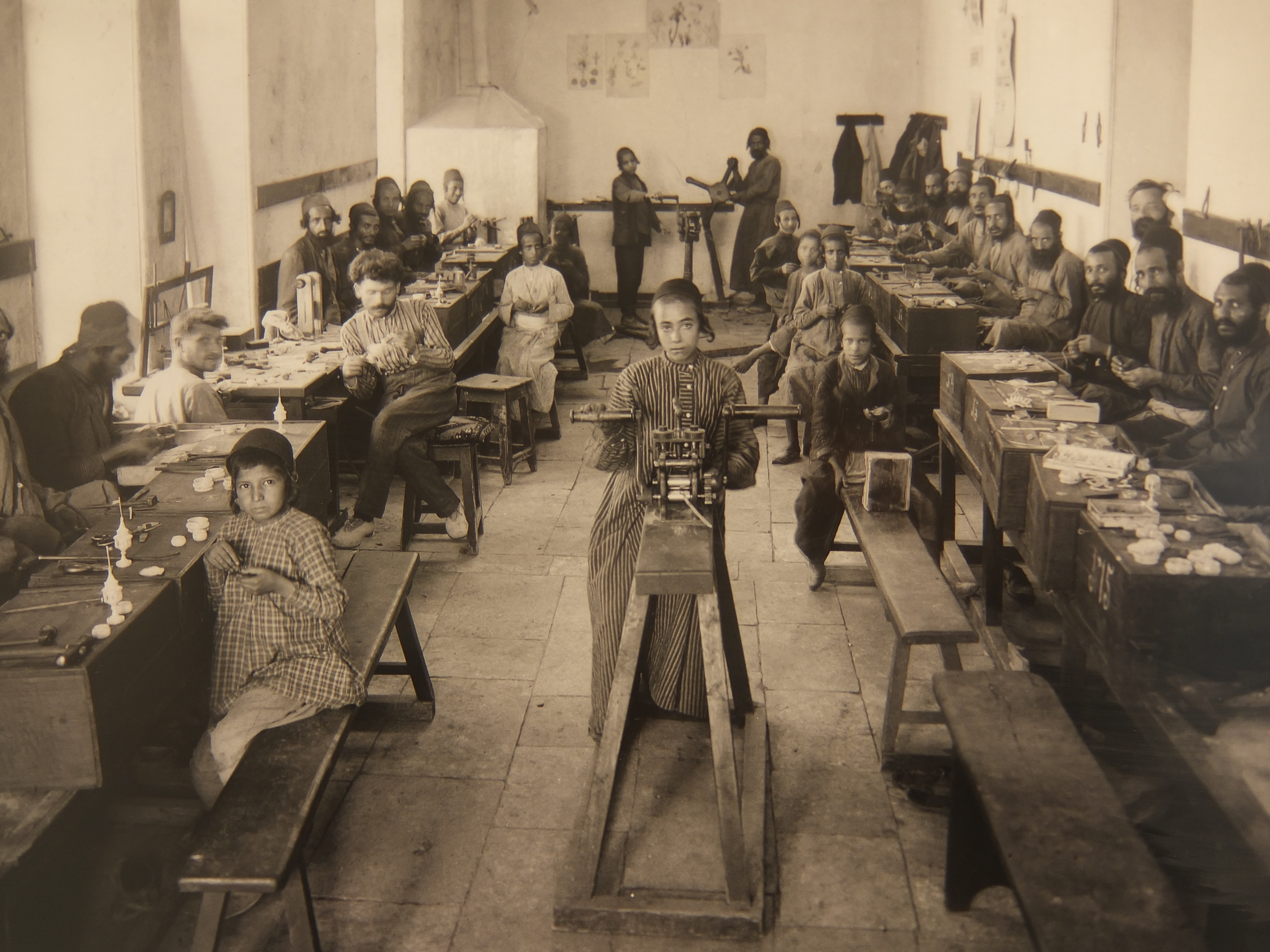
Yemenite silversmiths at Bezalel School of Art, 1909

According to Mark S. Wagner, Professor of Arabic literature and Islamic Law at Louisiana State University, it is difficult to say how silver- and gold-smithing came to be regarded as occupations that were too impure for Muslims in the Yemen to engage in. Jewish silversmiths in this region sometimes moonlighted as dentists, since their jeweler's pliers could be used to draw teeth. Notwithstanding, it was generally accepted in Yemen that specialist silversmiths enjoyed an influential status that towered over all others within the Jewish community, since silversmiths belonged to the community's spiritual elite.

Yemenite silversmiths melted silver coins to produce jambīya (dagger) hilts and scabbards, bridal jewellery and other silver objects. The Maria Theresa thaler, minted continuously since 1741, was especially favored for its consistent silver content and fineness (containing a 83 percent silver content; the rest an alloy), and as it was widely in use in Yemen owing to the Mocha coffee trade with the French, and a Yemeni request that its produce be paid with thalers.

== Styles and silver content ==
Yemenite silver-work is noted for its intricate use of filigree and fine granulation. Jewellery containing a high silver content was called ṭohōr by local Jews, or muḫlaṣ in Arabic, and referred to jewellery whose silver content ranged from 85 to 92 percent, while the rest was copper. In Sana'a, Jewish silversmiths routinely made use of the Maria Theresa thaler by remelting it. The less wealthy inhabitants of the cities and the rural regions, as well as Bedouins, would routinely order jewellery whose silver content was lower, up to 60 percent silver, the remainder being copper, and which was known by the name fuḍah ('silver' in Arabic). Even lower quality silver was called niṣfī, a word having the connotation of "half," implying that it was made half of silver and half of copper.

=== Labbe necklaces ===
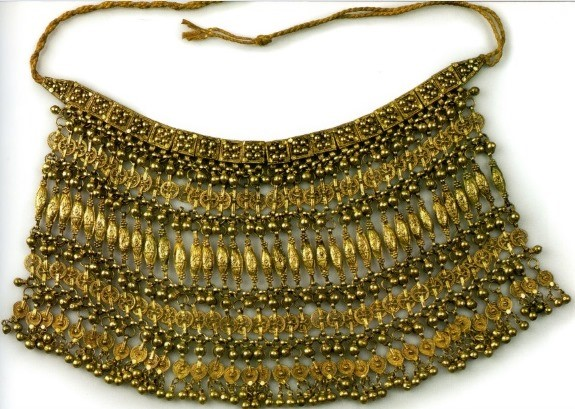
Barley-grain labbe necklace. Gilt silver filigree, granulation (20th century)

Among the variety of jewellery known in Yemen, the labbe (ornate bib-necklace) is the most impressive in its complexity. A highly skilled work of Jewish silversmiths, it is a testimony of exquisite craftsmanship, requiring painstaking work and a developed artistic sense, expressed by the harmonious and aesthetic blend of its many parts. The labbe is a popular piece of jewellery among Jewish and Muslim women alike. In Arabic, the name labbe indicates the sunken place beneath the Adam's apple on the neck, where it is worn.

Labbe necklaces made of applied filigree, being open and airy like the interlaced net of a spider's web, became more popular during the Ottoman conquest of Yemen in the mid-19th century, and were given the name labbat šabek in Sana'a, after its technique. Until then, most were prepared by using casting techniques, and embossing and fashioning from solid pieces. Only a few were made from silver. The labbe is traditionally made from dozens of components arranged in horizontal rows, or storeys (projected lines). The top row forms the base of the necklace, with connecting parts (usually serial pendants) densely strung upon a cotton or silk thread, extending downwards lengthwise, in identical columns forming the horizontal lines. It consists of one or more rows of parts, whose shapes are varied: diamond-shaped rhomboids, squares and rectangles, round beads or rosettes. Most contain smooth plates of metal, in circular and diamond-shaped (rhombus) forms, and are studded with jewels called in Arabic zihreh, meaning, pearls, amber, corals and colored glass. The artisans would also lavishly apply decorations made from small, rounded silver granules. Coin pendants are characteristic of the labbe necklaces worn by villagers. Large labbe necklaces may have as many as thirty or more rows.

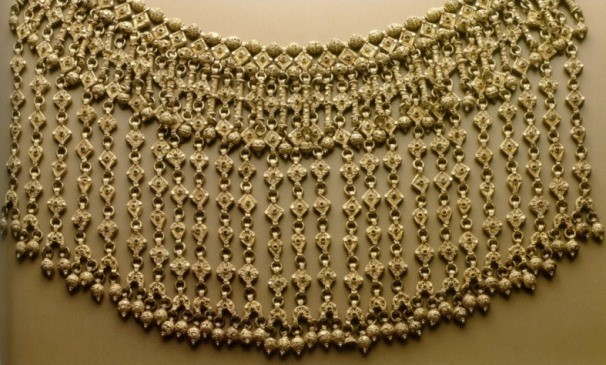
Labbe Shabek (Great Necklace) from Sana'a, Yemen – 19th or 20th century

The components are interconnected by coiled rings in the vertical and horizontal rows. The location of the items in the vertical lines are complementary to each other, as well as uniform along all the vertical lines. In the vertical lines there are four to eight items that are connected one beneath the other by a metal wire in the shape of the figure-eight, called in Arabic methamāna, meaning "eight." For most, the edges of the base end with either triangles or cones. Occasionally, motifs used in its base were also incorporated in the body of the labbe, particularly the rosette, the lozenge and the round bead. Labbe necklaces worn by Muslim women typically differed from those worn by Jewish women, insofar that they lacked a base. Labbe necklaces typically worn by Muslim women in central Yemen had convex components or motifs that were round and belly-shaped, resembling leaves or barley-grains (aqrāṭ še'īriyāt in Arabic). In some places, it was common to attach a piece of woven cloth on the back of the labbe, like the inner lining of garments, to protect the clothes and the embroidery, as well as the skin, from abrasions.

=== Scabbards for men's daggers ===
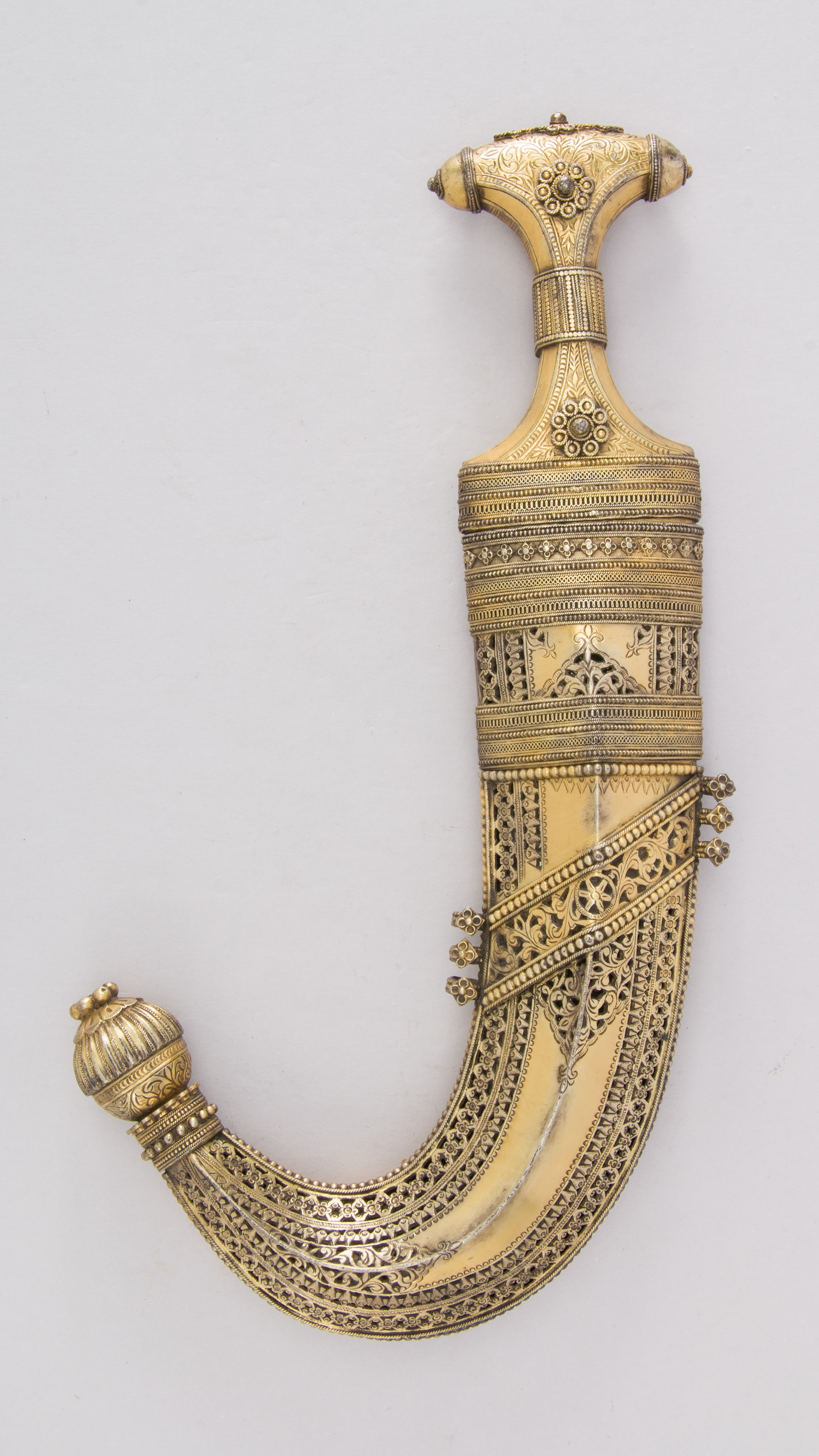
Dagger (janbīya) with gilded silver sheath

Traditionally, most non-Jewish Yemeni men wear a characteristic dagger (janbīya) with elaborate handles attached to their belt. The scabbards are made from wood and covered with leather, and if the bearer can afford it, the scabbards are adorned with an elaborate silver or even a gilded cover. Mainly produced in Sanaa, but also with regional variations, there are two main forms, the 'asīb worn by tribesmen in the middle of their body, and the thūma (plural thūwam), worn at the right side by members of the former leading classes, the Saiyids and the Qadis. The upper part of these scabbards is often decorated with a broad metal band or collar, called the locket, usually crafted of silver, engraved or pierced in scrollwork patterns or studded with small granules or glass beads in geometric patterns. At the lower end, the scabbard ends with a metal cap called the chape, that may prolong the scabbard's tip in a curved way almost up to the hilt. The common type of chape ends in a round knob or cone-shaped point, and they are usually made of thin silver alloy.

=== Techniques ===
While silver granules can also be made by dropping melted silver into cold water, in Yemen, most silversmiths used a different technique. The silver granules (šaḏir) were prepared from a silver wire, cut into small pieces, which were then covered by embers that were heated by a flame, by which they obtained their round shape. This process forms perfectly round granules, or "droplets", that were soldered onto the piece of jewellery as desired.

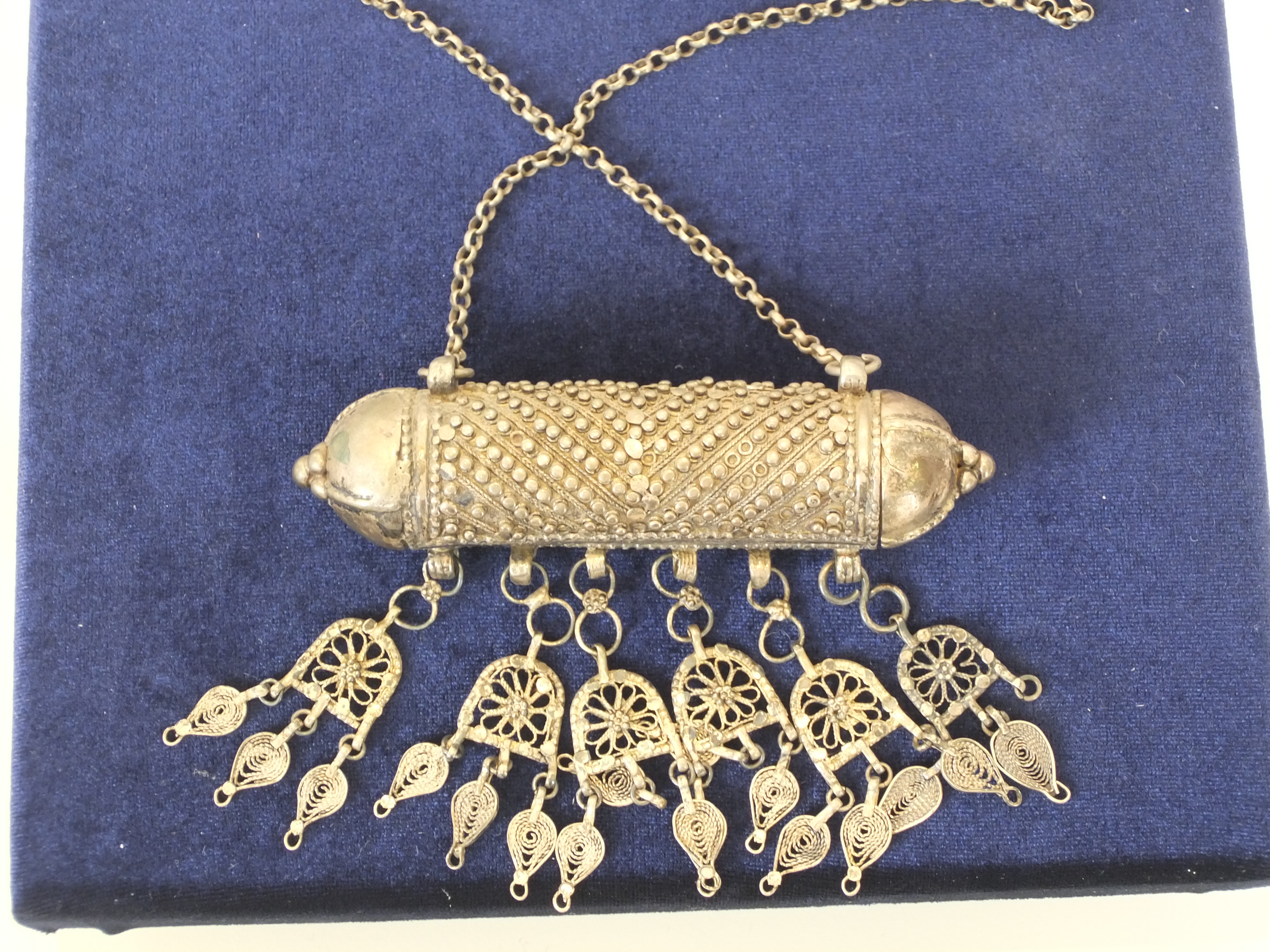
Silver amulet case with pendants

Granulation was a common form of decorative technique used in the making of rings, bracelets and large necklaces. Granulated necklaces were the most complicated to make, where the use of granulation was central. From these granules, the artisans prepared masbū'āt – the rose-like cluster consisting of seven granules, and matisū'āt – the diamond-shaped rhombus consisting of nine granules, the mulberry beads known as tūt for the choker necklace (ma'naqeh), among other items.

Silver wires were made in Yemen by taking raw, unshaped silver (sabāyik in Arabic), melting it in a crucible and then pouring the melted silver into a finger-length mold made from special earth shaped like a tube. This produced ingots. Different sizes of wire were obtained by extruding the wire ingot through a steel, perforated device called mağarrah (see #Terminology). The silversmith would hold down the device between his feet and pull on the wire with a pair of tongs or forceps (nippers), and, occasionally, with his own teeth to tighten the grip on the tongs. By applying force by moving his entire body weight left and right, he would eventually succeed in stretching the wire and threading it through the hole. This ancient method was sustained until the introduction of modern, steel mechanical devices for making wires at the turn of the 20th-century, which then diminished considerably the time consumed in making the silver and gold wire. What would formerly take several days to make was now done in one hour. Such wires served as one of the basic elements of design for most jewellery pieces.

A substance similar to borax (known as tinkār in the Yemenite dialect of Arabic – and otherwise known as the "glue of the silversmith" – was solely used in Yemen for the purpose of soldering in order to bind together two separate silver pieces (especially for applying fine and delicate work, such as granules, to a silver plate). Cadmium was not used in Yemen for this purpose at all. A different substance was used when soldering silver wires to a plate, which were applied to the plate by wire soldering tweezers. (Note: A modern technique of making a temporary binder (jeweler's cement) is to take 6 parts of lump rosin to 4 parts of plaster of paris. The rosin is heated slowly until it melts, and plaster is then added slowly, stirring in a small amount at a time. Proportions can be adjusted for a harder or softer cement. Gum Arabic and Tragacanth gum are both used as a glue in several processes, such as granulation, niello, and in some soldering situations. They completely volatilize under the heat and leave no residue ash.)

By the mid-20th century, the silversmith in Yemen bought all these materials (granules, wires and plates) pre-manufactured.

==== Casting and Niello technique ====
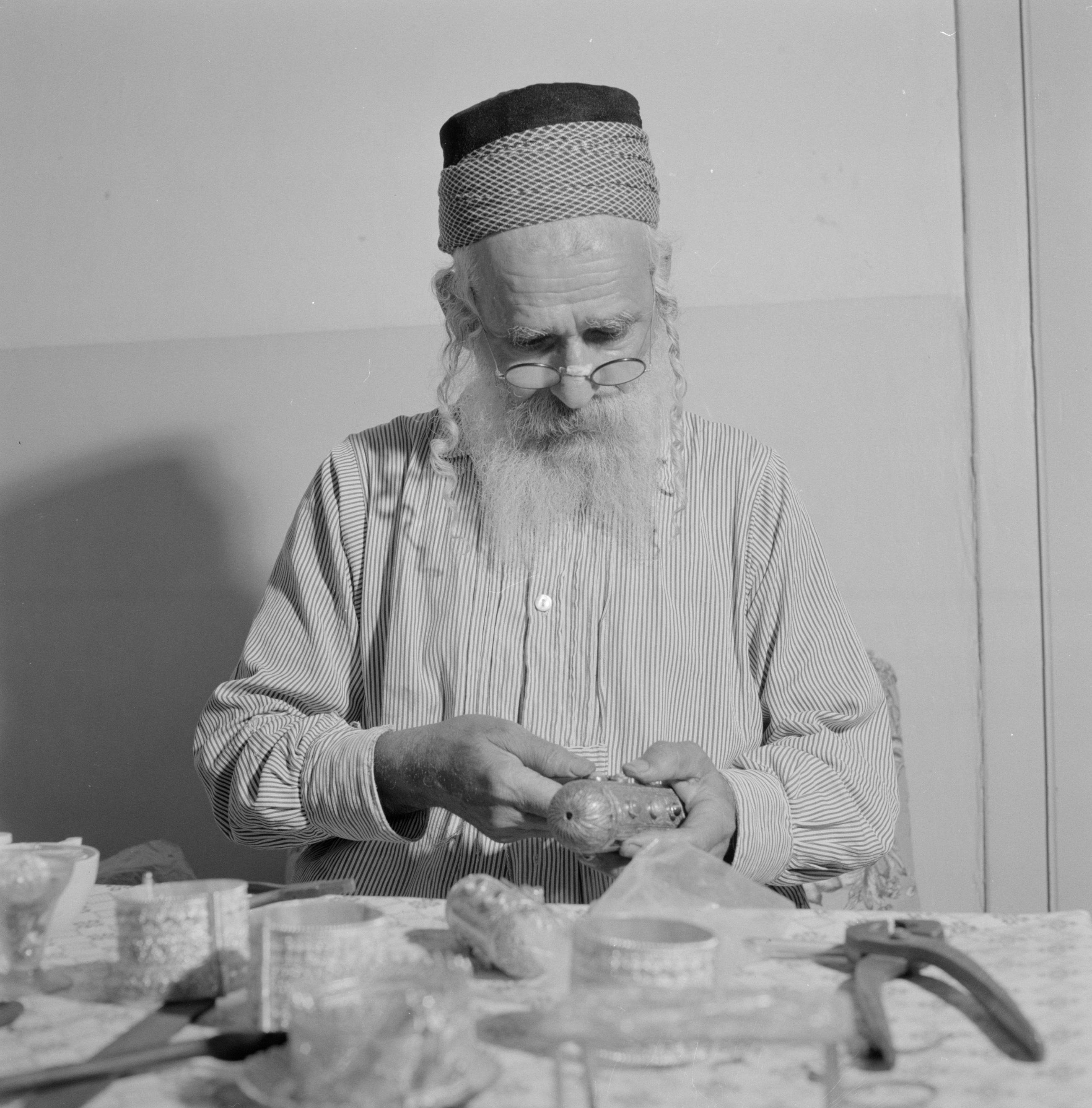
Silversmith Yosef Salah (Tzadok) in his trade

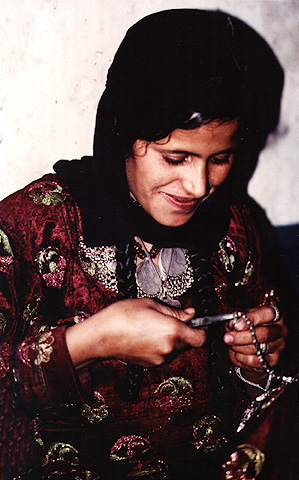
Yemenite Jewish silversmith in Wadi Amlaḥ, 1980s

The relative composition of different metals used in making a niello bracelet in Yemen varied, although a popular composite consisted of the following: For every 10 grammes of fine red copper (Arabic: ṭab), they added 20 grammes of black lead (Arabic: raṣāṣ aswad), 1 gram of sterling silver (Judeo-Arabic: ṭohōr), 3 grammes of sulphur (Arabic: kabrit), and 3/4 gramme of crude borax (Arabic: tinkār) (for definition of this term, see infra).

The heaviest metals were first put inside the crucible (Arabic: būṭa) for melting, followed by the lighter metals: silver and copper, brought to a boiling state, after which the craftsman added lead, followed by sulphur. Once the sulphur was added to the mixture and stirred, the craftsman poured the molten metal into a flat mold (Arabic: mafraj) made of molding sand (a process known as casting), which was done before the sulphur burnt out. The mold was made with many sunken, groove-like impressions and insertable slots running lengthwise where the craftsman poured the molten metal to form either rods (wires) or plaques. Experienced silversmiths in Yemen would cast the desired shape by first adding tinkār (a solder made of crude borax) into a mold with powdered sulphur. The tinkār, in this case, was first pounded to a powder and mixed together with a finely ground niello metal piece after it had solidified, and powdered elements were added to the mold before casting the molten metal. This prevented the appearance of a hardened, membranous film on the surface of the finished object due to the heat.

After casting in the mold for making rectangular ingots, the artisans removed the metal after it had solidified, and began to work it into a flat sheet of silver by pounding with a wooden mallet, until it was perfectly flat and had a conformity in its thickness, based on eyesight and feel. In Yemen, there were no micrometers. The flat sheet of silver was then cut with snips to its desired size, after which it was rolled over the rounded end of an iron implement (having one end that was rounded), similar to a ball-peen hammer (Arabic: ribāl), until it was fashioned into what resembled a hollow pipe. Within its center, molten lead was cast, or else a different substance known as qār, made from what is left after burning wood, and which had the same malleability as lead. (Note: Although lead is a soft metal and malleable, according to Rabbi Qafih, the qār substance used in filling the cavity was preferable over lead, since removing it from the cavity was easier to do, whereas with lead if the silver piece were to be overheated when extracting the lead, the craftsman ran the risk of damaging the surface of the silver bracelet by the molten lead, resulting in a perforated product. Mishnah Kelim 10:2 mentions the property of lead as being able to tighten a hold on a lid and to support it, but which cannot form a hermetic seal on ceramic-ware lids.) After the pipe had been filled with molten lead and solidified, began the process of slowly bending the silver into the shape of a bracelet.

To facilitate the easy fashioning of this cylindrical pipe soon-to-be bracelet, the craftsmen would make use of a block of wood, appx. 30 centimetres (12 in) in height, 20 centimetres (7.9 in) wide, and 35 centimetres (14 in) in length, in which there was a groove measuring 3 fingerbreadths in diameter, and which ran clear across the entire surface of the block of wood at a depth of ca. 6 centimetres (2.4 in). The block of wood was made with several of these grooves, in various sizes, some deeper and narrower than the others. Through this groove, the craftsman would pass a wooden rod with which he rounded and bent the bracelet into shape. He passed the cylindrical pipe through the groove, first at its breadth, and afterwards narrowing it, repeating the process until eventually he was left with the desired shape and the two ends of the cylindrical pipe were brought closer together. After achieving a smooth bracelet, where welding was done from within the bracelet (rather than on its outside), the craftsman marked with charcoal or a pencil the designs he wished to make on the niello product and forthwith began the process of etching, making use of variously designed burins, float files, and gouges, some flat-tipped, others pointed; some rounded and others made like a pair of compasses, etc.

Once etching was completed, the lead was removed by slightly heating the bracelet in fire. After emptying-out the lead, the craftsman then welded the two halves together at their respective ends, leaving one or two small holes in the bracelet, so that when it was reheated it did not burst due to the accumulation of vapors. The piece was then cleaned off thoroughly and burnished with finely ground sea sand that had been sifted (Arabic: baṭḥa), so as not to cause abrasions to the finished product. The sea sand was kept in an earthenware vessel. In those places where the artisan made designs and wanted them to be highlighted with a blueish-grey hue, he painted the area with the powdered niello metallic compounds (consisting of sulphur, copper, silver, and lead), and placed the finished piece over a brazier bearing coals (Arabic: maghmareh) for heating over a low heat, to which was attached a pair of bellows used to lightly blow air into the brazier. Over the brazier there was a grid-iron to support the bracelet. During this process, the bracelet was turned over the fire so as to melt the powdered substance applied to it. Afterwards, the bracelet was removed from the brazier and allowed to cool, and was once again burnished with finely ground sea sand.

== Terminology ==
Chabath
Slag that comprises litharge of silver (produced in the silversmith's refinery, being the byproduct or waste of smelting metal) (Note: In Yemen, the method of extraction from the silversmith's refinery was as follows: After collecting the dried dung of cattle and after it was burnt until it becomes like fine powder, it was pounded and placed beneath the place where the silversmith would work the silver. When soldering pieces together, he would then take lead (or cadmium) and silver; he smelted the lead (or cadmium) while fanning the unalloyed silver (ṭohōr), so that the two pieces adhere together. The molten lead that fell below was sifted with the dried dung. This substance is litharge of silver. Once the substance hardens from the molten lead and silver, and forms into a rock-like substance, he takes it up and chisels away the greyish or blackish stone, leaving only the brown colored stone. He then takes a brittle cloth or pad and washes it in soapy water, allowing it to dry thereafter. Whenever the substance was needed, he would take up the desired quantity and crush it in mortar and pestle. It was pounded until fine, sifted through a sieve, and again pounded. The dust, litharge of silver, served as an antiperspirant, and also acts to fill-up cavities caused by ulcers and to soften tumours. The ground powder was stored in a small, sealed container.)
Fatil
Twisted silver wire; one wire that is twined from two thin metal wires
Fuḍah
Alloyed silver
Kullabatayn-yad
Nippers; metal tool, formed of two crossed and articulated parts, terminated by jaws, and used for pulling wires through a metal, perforated device in order to form thin silver or gold wires
Kutub
Amulet encasement
Lāz aswad
Niello-decorated (also called kaḥāl)
Mağarrah
A many holed, steel perforated device used to make thin silver or gold wires by pulling the silver (or gold) wire through the desired hole having the desired width.
Mshawsaq
Rhomboids
Qubleh
Hood adornment, usually made from fine, filigree jewelled silver pieces used as appliqué and sewn on the gargush hood.
Ṣab
The complete casting of a jewellery piece, such as a bracelet
Sabāyik
Raw, unshaped gold or silver
Ṣom
A substance used by the older Yemenites in smelting silver, used primarily in very fine and delicate applications so as not to suffer the silver to melt before it was shaped and applied.
Ṭab
fine red copper used in jewellery making.
Tiklūl
White silver granules
Tinkār
Pulver (a soldering powder made from crude borax, chemical formula: Na_{2}B_{4}O_{7}·10H_{2}O) (Note: Formerly, when soldering, they would first apply to the place of connection a pulver of crude borax, and then apply a smoldering substance (silver and lead), which was then heated. Today, in modern techniques, they use either a thin metal wire which is melted or plate of same substance. The purpose of the tinkār was to prevent the appearance of a thin film on the surface of the bracelet due to the heat. Without which, the thin membranous film would become hardened on the surface of the jewellery piece)
Ṭohōr
Sterling silver (usually obtained by remelting silver coins, those with a silver-content of no less than 85% silver and 15% copper)

== Museum holdings and exhibitions ==
Among other collections, Yemenite silver jewellery is owned by the Israel Museum, the Walters Art Museum, the Metropolitan Museum of Art, and the British Museum. It has been publicly shown in the following exhibitions:

- Diadem and Dagger: Jewish Silversmiths of Yemen, Walters Art Museum, 2002–2003.
- "Silver Speaks: Traditional Jewelry of the Middle East", The Bead Museum in Washington, D.C., 2002–2003; Arab American National Museum, 2007–2008.

== Gallery ==
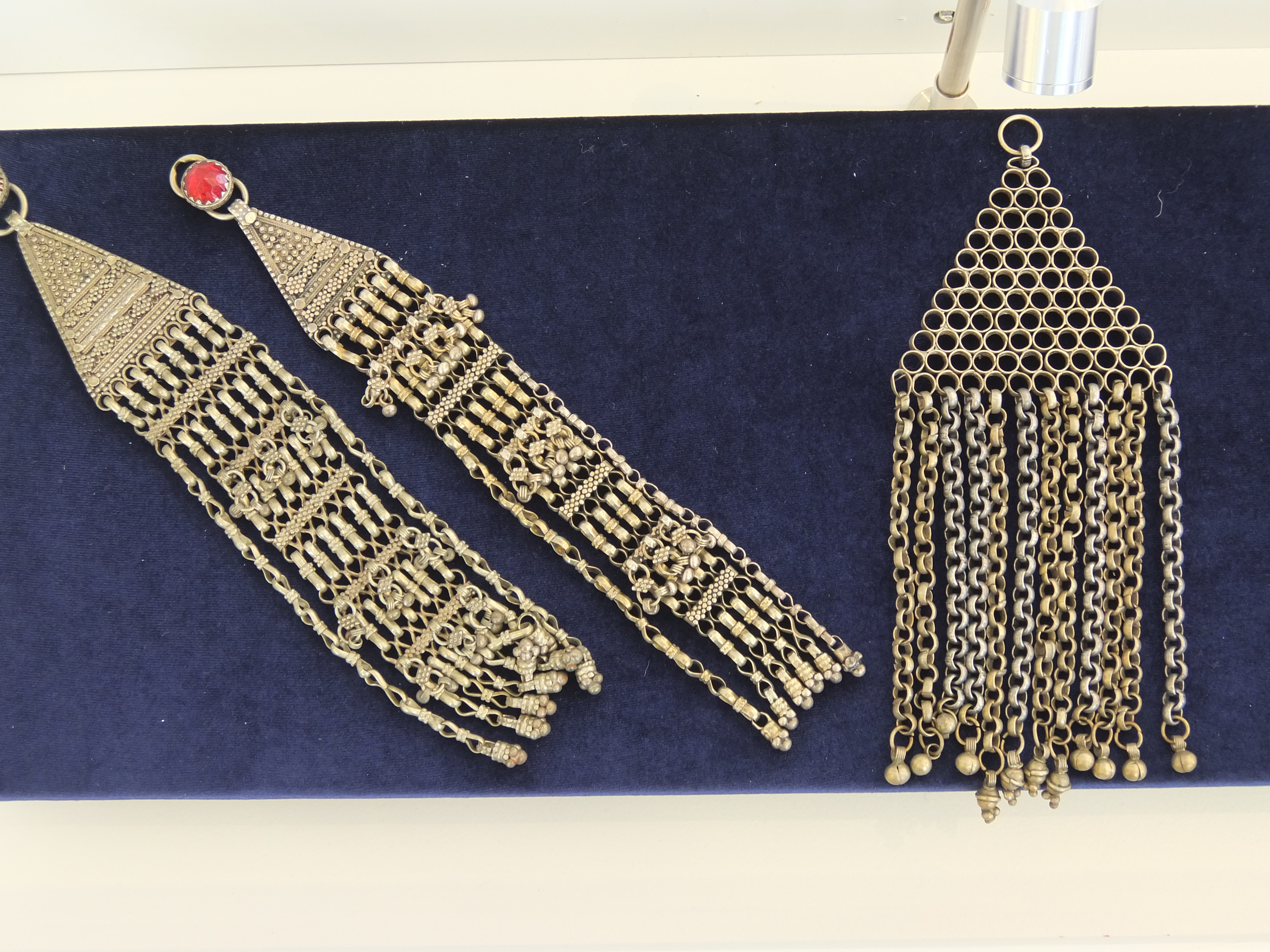
Silver earrings

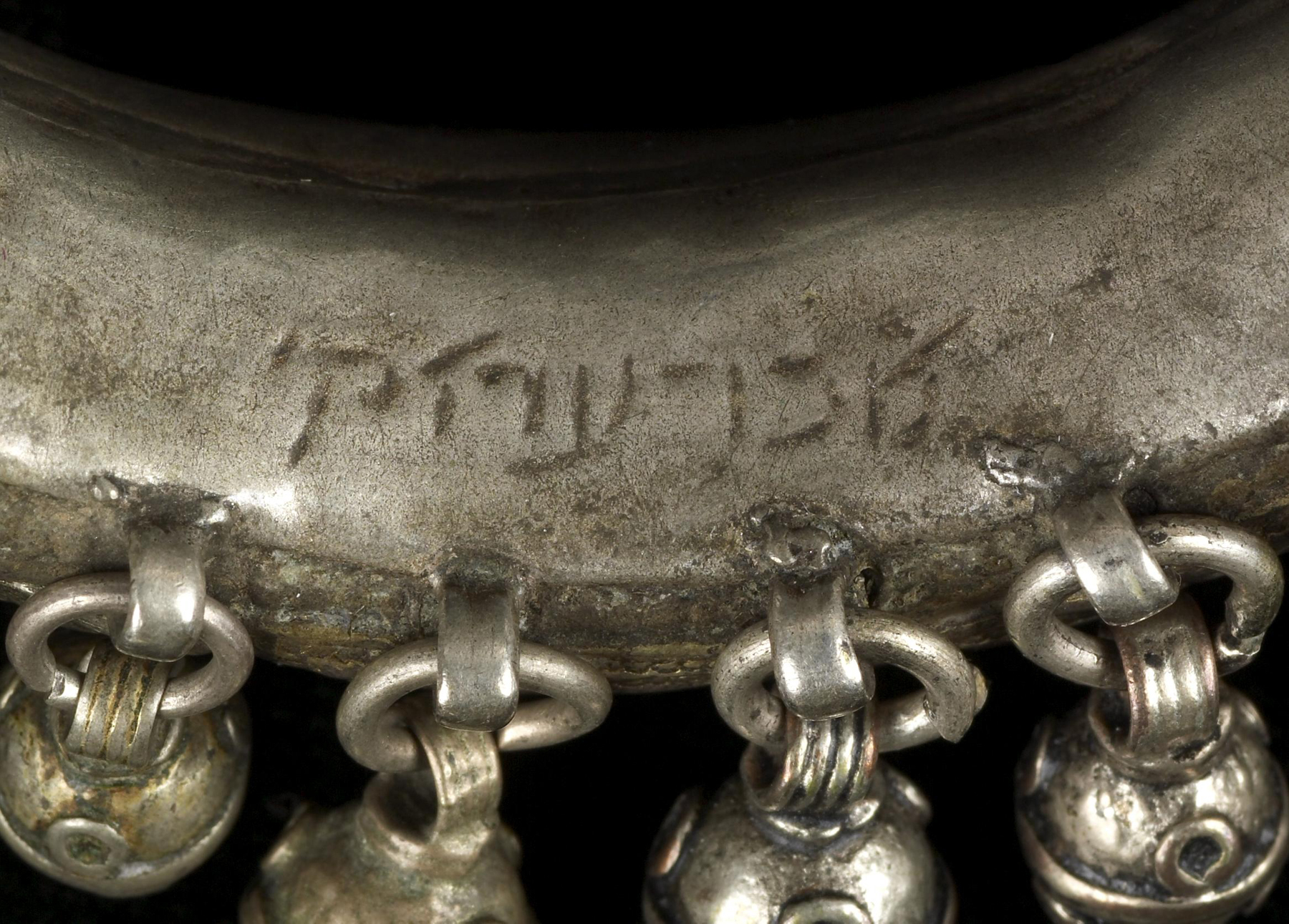
Yemenite bracelet with signature of artisan

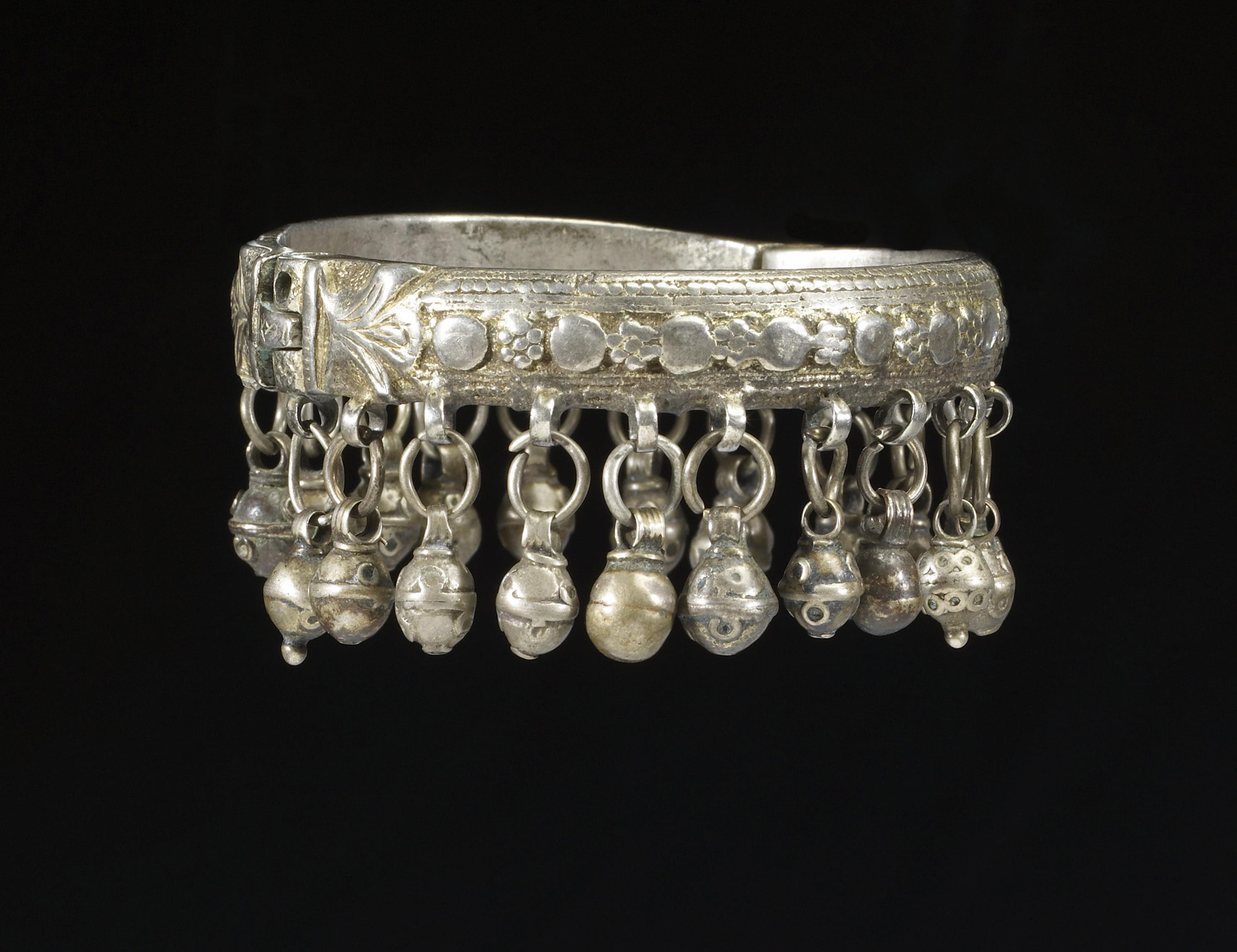
Silver bracelet

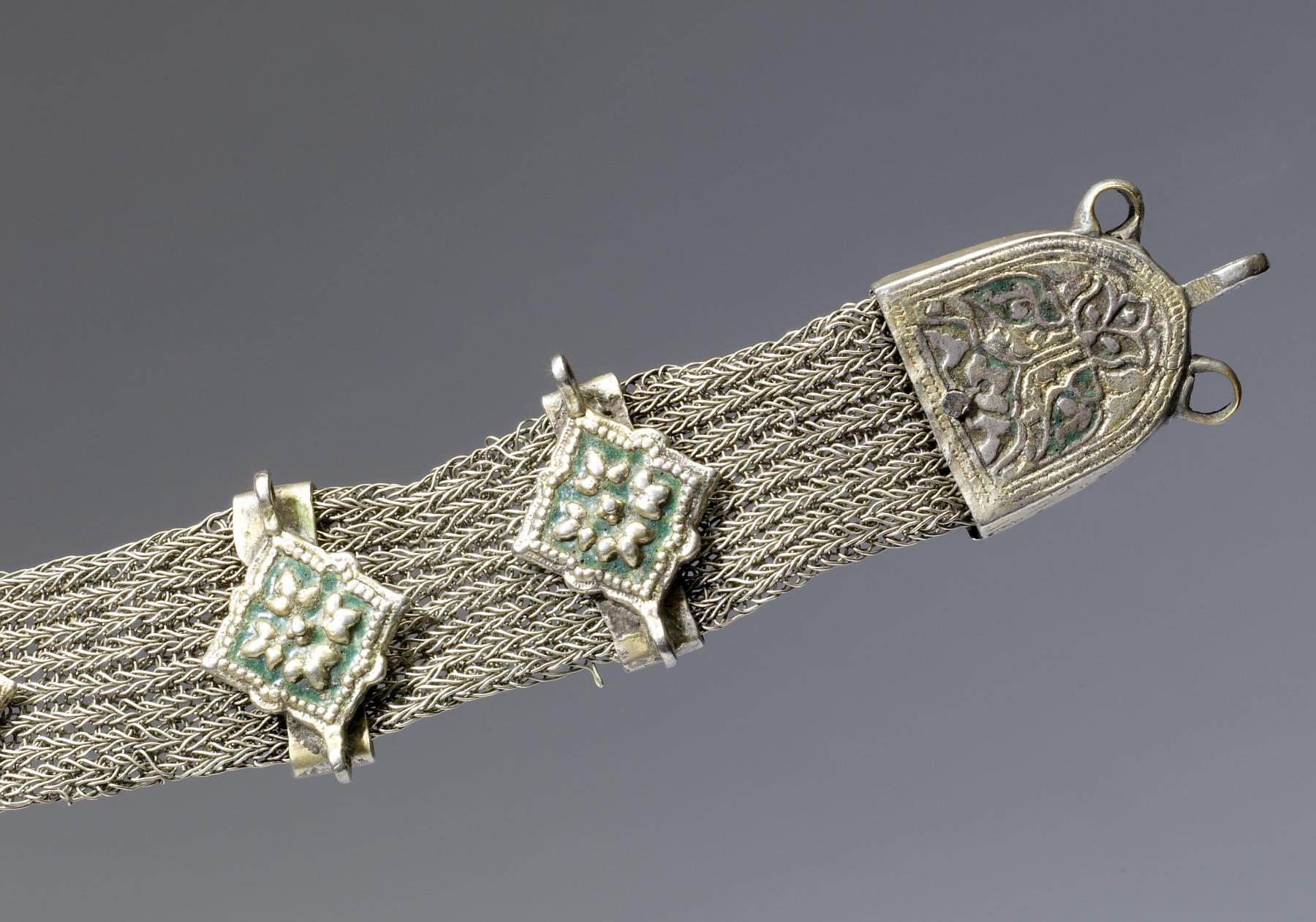
A woman's headband

== See also ==
- Jewish ceremonial art
- Gargush
- Bezalel Academy of Arts and Design

== Bibliography ==
- Amar, Z.; Serri, Yaron (2004). The Land of Israel and Syria as Described by al-Tamimi – Jerusalem Physician of the 10th Century (in Hebrew). Ramat-Gan. ISBN 965-226-252-8. OCLC 607157392.
- Colyer-Ross, H. (1981). Bedouin Jewellery. Fribourg
- Daum, Werner. (2016) The Origins of Yemen's Traditional Silver Jewellery. In P.I. Pogorelsky and M.I. Vasilenko (eds.), Arabian Routes in the Asian Context, Saint-Petersburg, Peter the Great Museum of Anthropology and Ethnography (Kunstkamera) of the Russian Academy of Sciences, pp. 191–234.
- Guilat, Yael (2018), "The 'Israelization' of Yemenite-Jewish Silversmithing", in Rachel Yedid; Danny Bar-Maoz (eds.), Ascending the Palm Tree: An Anthology of the Yemenite Jewish Heritage, Rehovot: E'ele BeTamar, OCLC 1041776317 [first published in Zmanim (A Historical Quarterly), 110 (2010), pp. 80–90 (in Hebrew)]
- Heimberg, U. (1986). Filigran und Granulation: Dekorationstechniken bei südwestarabischen Silberarbeiten, Baessler-Archiv, N.S. LIX/1, Berlin (Reimer)
- Ḥibshūsh, H. (1983). Masot Habshush (The Journeys of Habshush): The Vision of Yemen – Rawʻiah al-Yaman, with an introduction by S.D. Goitein (Hebrew)
- Janata, A. (1989). Jemen: Im Lande der Königin von Saba, Wein (Vienna)
- Klein-Franke, Aviva (1983). "Economic Conditions, Commerce and Crafts of the Jews in Yemen". Se'i Yona – Yemenite Jews in Israel (סעי יונה - יהודי תימן בישראל) (in Hebrew). Tel-Aviv: "Ee'le Betamar" association and "Am Oved". pp. 47–70. OCLC 180684596.
- Klein-Franke, Aviva (2008), "Silver and Gold Cuirass of Mail (The Labbe Necklaces)", in Abdar, Carmella (ed.), Ma'ase Rokem: Dress and Jewelry in the Tradition of the Jews of Yemen, Tel-Aviv: E'ele BeTamar, pp. 89–102, OCLC 646795963
- Muchawsky-Schnapper, E. (2000). The Yemenites: Two Thousand Years of Jewish Culture. Jerusalem
- Qafih, Y. (1982a). Halichot Teman (Jewish Life in Sanà) (in Hebrew). Jerusalem: Ben-Zvi Institute. ISBN 965-17-0137-4. OCLC 863513860.
- Qafih, Y. (1982b). "'Lāz' or 'Kaḥāl' – technique of producing niello – a blackened glaze on gold". Peʻamim: Quarterly – Studies in the Cultural Heritage of Oriental Jewry (Ed. Itzhak Bezalel) (in Hebrew) (11). Ben-Zvi Institute: 89–93. JSTOR 23423679.
- Sergeant, R. B. & Lewcock, R. (1983). Sana: An Arabian City, London
- Untracht, O. (1975). Metal Techniques for Craftsmen. Garden City, N.Y.: Doubleday & Co. OCLC 654997163.
- Untracht, O. (1982). Jewellery Concepts and Technology. NW London
- van Praag, Esther (2007). "Jewish Silversmiths in Yemen". TEMA – Journal of Judeo-Yemenite Studies. Netanya: Association for Society and Culture.
