= Granulation (jewellery) =

Technique for decorating jewellery

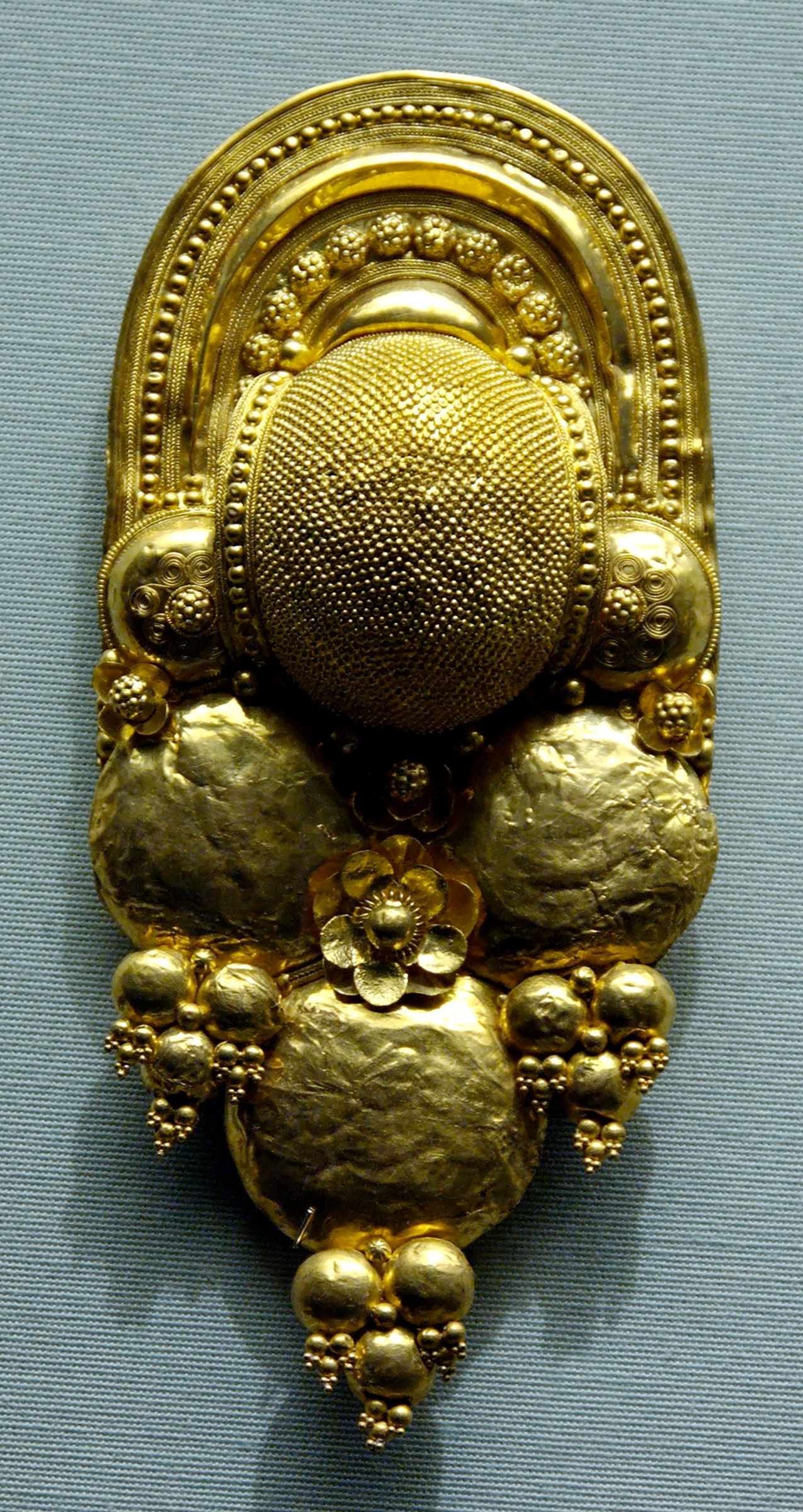
Granulated Etruscan earring, 4th century B.C.

Granulation is a jewellery manufacturing technique whereby a surface is covered in spherules or granules of precious metal. The technique is thought to have its origins in Sumer about 5,000 years ago. This technique then spread to southern Europe during the orientalizing period, also through the role of Phoenicians, who had founded colonies in Sardinia, Sicily and Spain, or Near Eastern craftsmen.

In the first millennium B.C. the technique was used by Etruscans living in present-day Italy. Greek craftsmen also employed the technique, but it was the work coming from Etruria which became famous, in part due to the mysteries surrounding the process.

== Methods ==
Granulation may be employed in three elaborate ways: the outline style, in which lines of grains are used as an adjunct to embossed forms; the silhouette style, in which figures are rendered with solid masses of grains; and the reserved silhouette style, a very rare technique in which the background is filled in with grains, while the main features are embossed but are otherwise left undecorated.

There are three basic techniques that may be used to attach granules to a metal surface: hard soldering, fusing and colloidal soldering. The metals used in granulation are usually gold and/or silver alloys of high purity – alloys below 18 kt. gold and sterling silver being unsuitable. With each technique, the process begins with the making of the granules themselves.

The granules are made from the same material as the base to which they will be affixed. Very narrow fringes may be cut along the edge of a thin sheet of metal, a further cut producing small squares or rectangles of metal. After being melted into globules, these may be sorted into various sizes by the use of appropriate meshes or by hand. Another option is to use thin wire coiled around a mandrel, the coil then being cut into small rings - this creates even-sized granules when melted.

The technique is notoriously difficult; the Ancient Greeks had young children place the granules due to the extreme patience and near perfect eyesight needed to place each granule onto the base of the metal being fused.

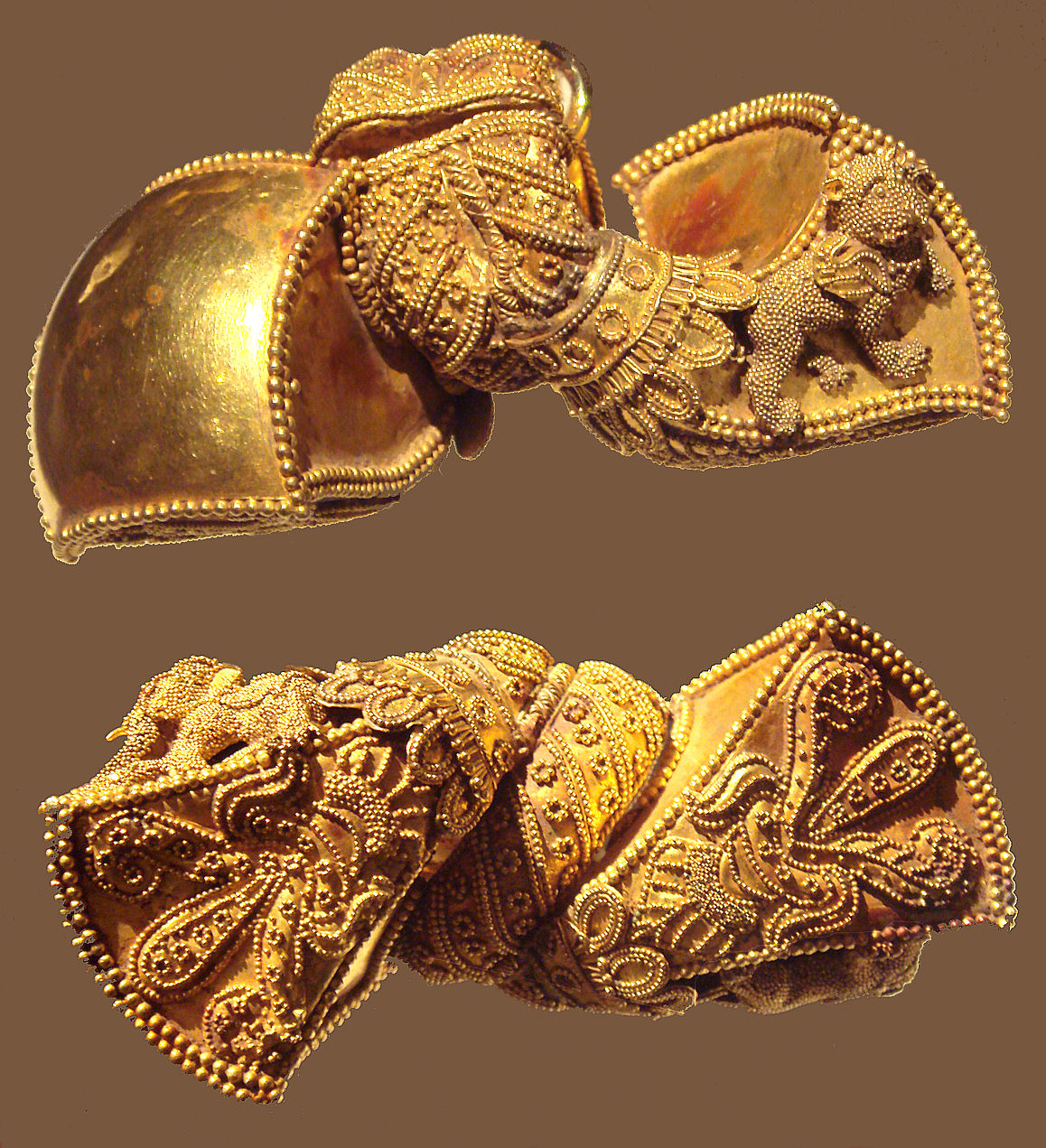
Fine granulation on Indian earrings, 1st century BC

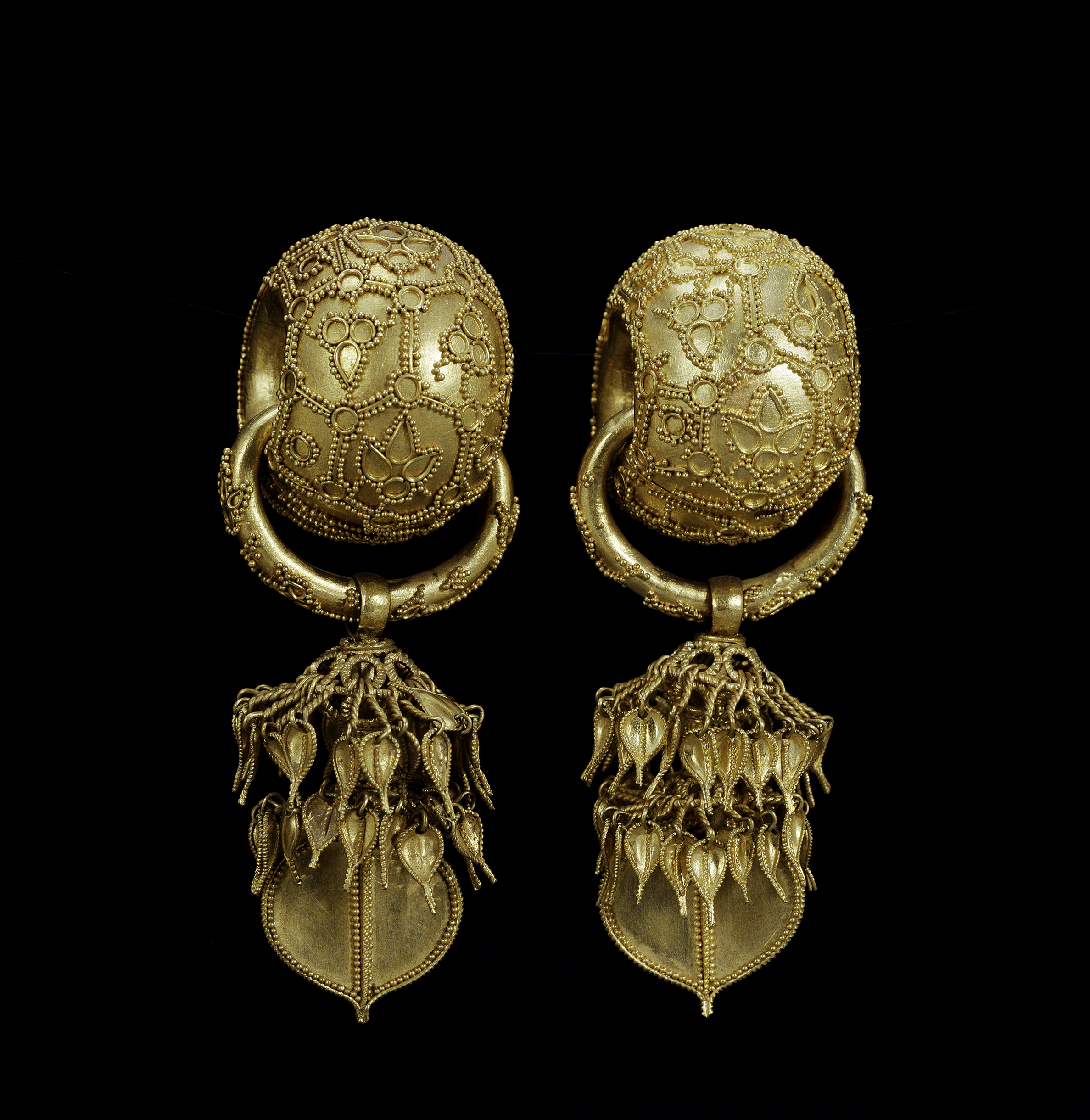
Granulated 6th century earrings found in South Korea

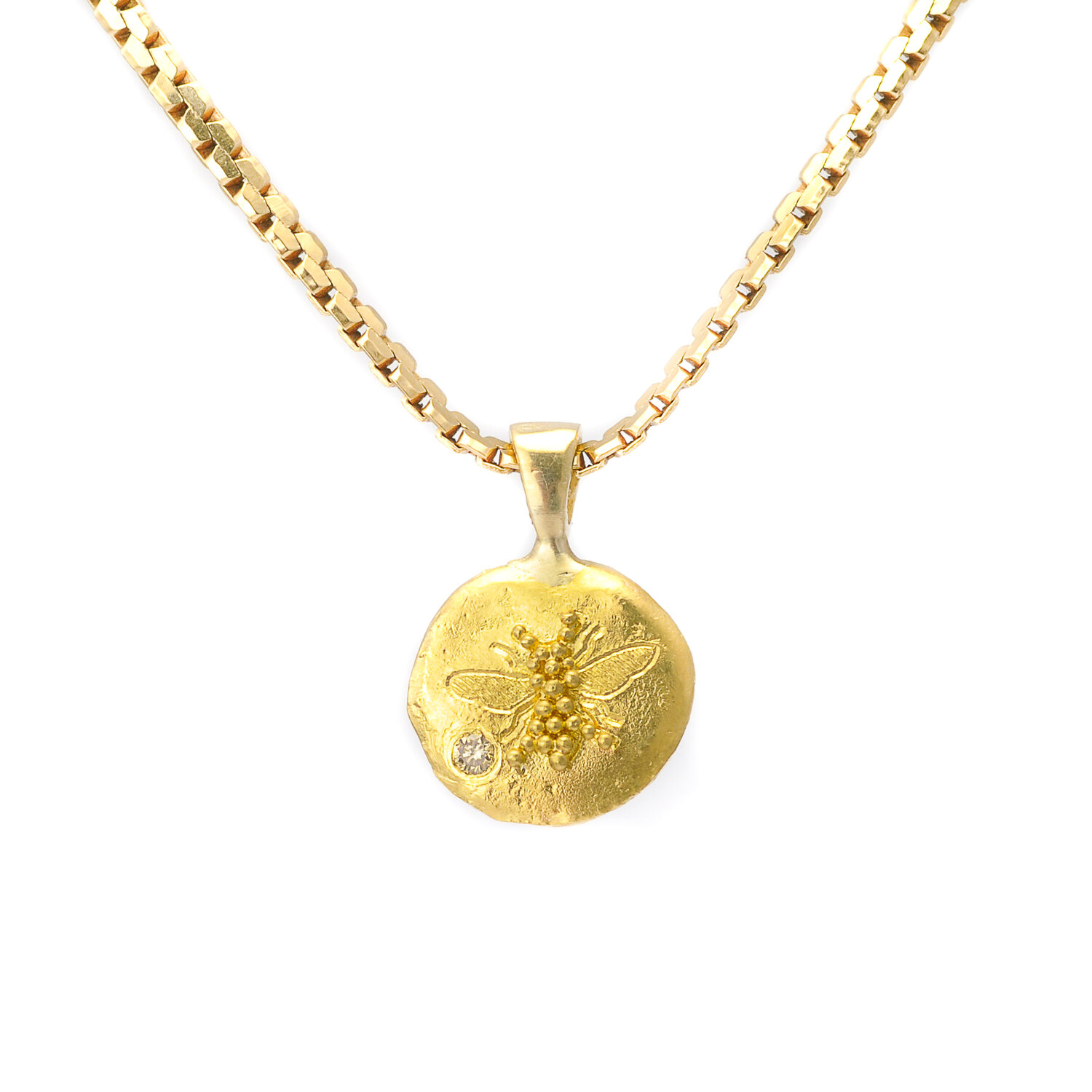
Piece in 22 karat yellow featuring modern advancements in the technique. Granulation combined with CNC technology used to create "The Gold Bee by Nelly". c. 2018

=== Colloidal soldering ===
Colloidal or eutectic soldering was used by the Etruscans, and employs a colloidal mixture of tragacanth gum and copper salts. The mixture lowers the melting points of both granules and base, and causes the copper to diffuse into both at the point of contact, creating a strong metallic bond. The colloidal solder is painted onto the surface of the base, and the granules arranged on the wet solder using a fine brush, after which the piece is left to dry. It is then fired in a reducing kiln causing the tragacanth to burn off and release the copper salt. At the eutectic temperature (890 °C or 1,630 °F) the copper diffuses into the granules and base, joining them together.

The exact ancient technique is uncertain, but modern pieces in colloidal soldering can resemble original ancient pieces when analyzed using chemical and advanced imaging methods.

The joints between metal permits determination of whether the technique was achieved. After finishing the heating process, the granules must be attached to the base and then attached to each other. This creates a stronger and more desirable structure. Currently there are only a few experts on the technique in the world as many of the technique's secrets were lost in ancient times -- although Pliny the Elder immortalized the technique in his biographical accounts.

=== Fusing ===
Fusing joins metals composed of the same alloy by the use of heat alone. A sheet of metal of thickness near the diameter of the granules ensures an even heat distribution. The granules are positioned using a diluted flux and fine brush, after which the sheet is fired in a reducing oven. At melting temperature the granules and sheet metal fuse, leaving no flux or solder. This technique was used by the Etruscans in the first millennium BC. Modern techniques achieve fusing by using electric current and the process is known as fusion welding. The electric current passes through each granule, generating sufficient heat to weld the granules to the base. This method may be used on finished items, even those with set stones.

=== Hard soldering ===
Hard soldering metal items together exploits the capillary action of solder with a lower melting point flowing between the items to be bonded. Soldering is routinely used by bench jewellers and is an ancient technique but is applied with great difficulty to small metal grains. Extremely small pieces of solder are positioned close to the point of contact between the granule and the metal, and then heated to melting point. The necessity of repeating this process many hundreds of times renders the technique impractical and expensive, complicated by the possibility of dislodging granules already attached. An improvement to this method is filing the solder to powder size and mixing it with the flux. The work area is painted with tragacanth and the granules are bedded on this using a fine brush. Having dried, the work is sprinkled with the flux-solder powder and heated to melting point. Surplus solder will lodge in the gaps between the granules, an effect which cannot be avoided.

== See also ==
- Jewellery of the Berber cultures
- Yemenite Silversmithing
