= Gargush =

Traditional Yemenite Jewish headdress

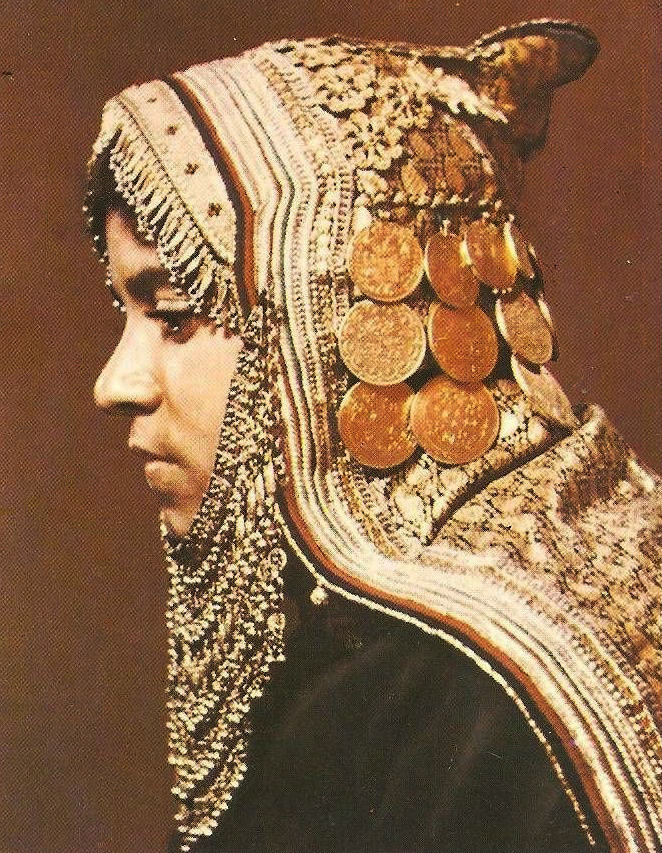
Traditional gargush

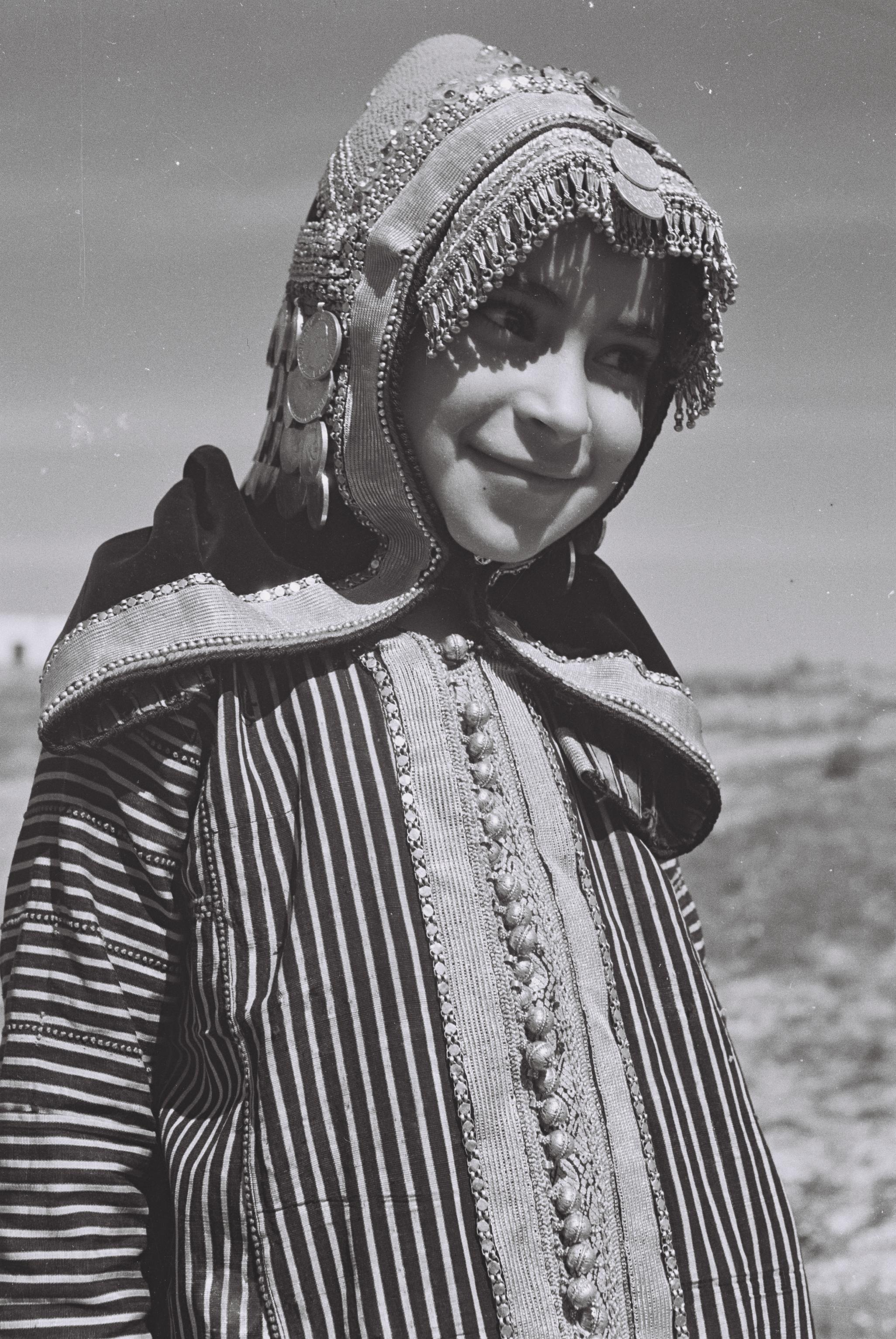
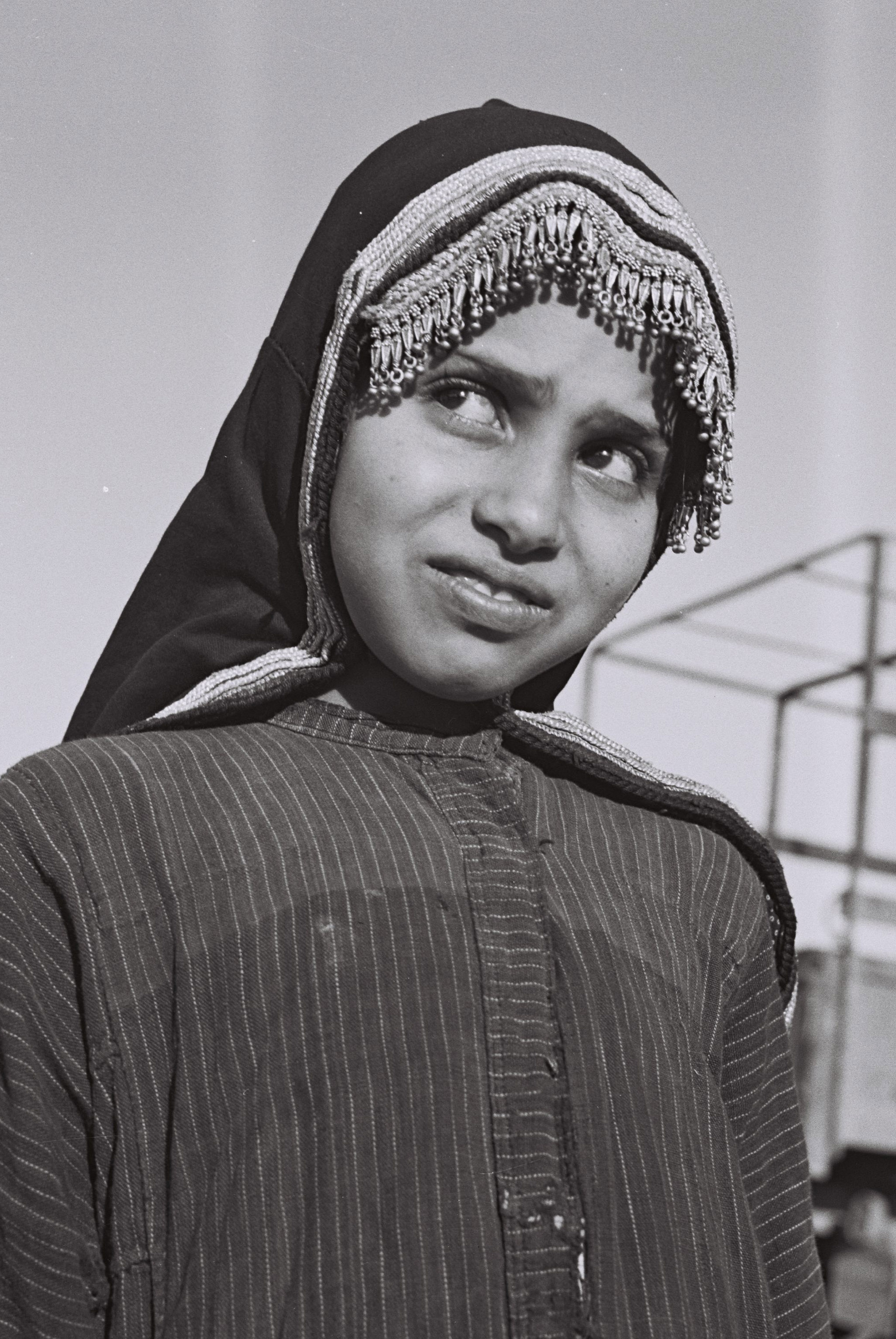
Different types of gargush headdresses

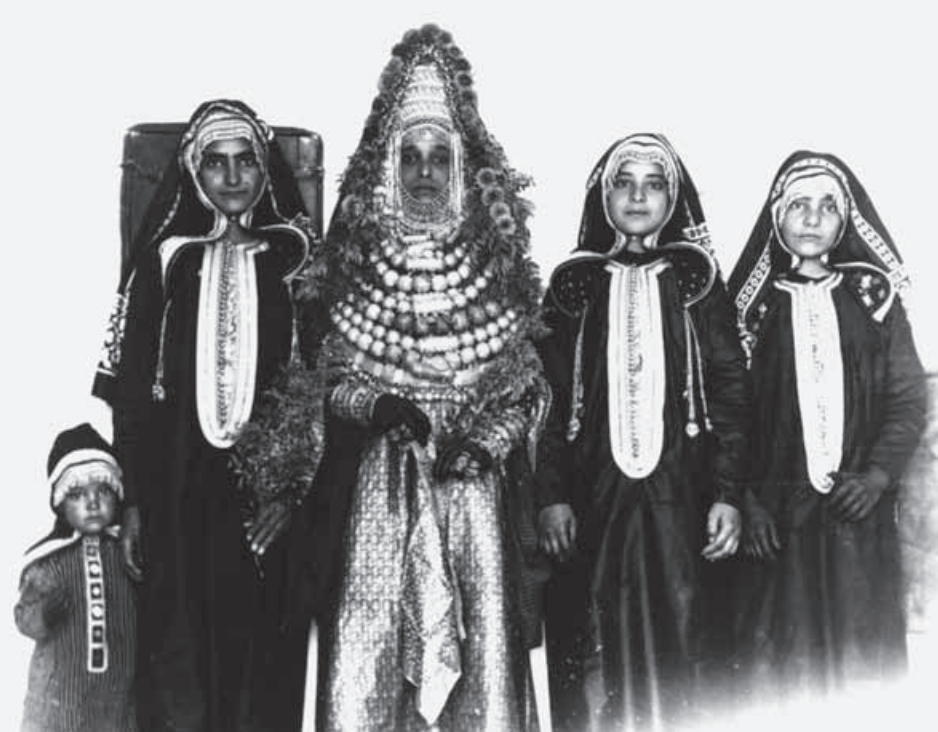
Sanaite Jews wearing gargushes, 1936

The gargush (Hebrew: קרקוש) is a traditional Yemenite Jewish headdress, resembling a hood that is thought to have originated in the Sanaani community. It's worn as a traditional headpiece among Israeli Jews in the modern era.

== History ==
Yemenite Jews have throughout the ages preserved ancient Jewish modesty traditions through their clothing. The gargush has been the primary headdress worn by Yemenite Jewish women for many generations. In Sanaa and the surrounding area, the gargush distinguished Jewish women from Muslim women. Jewish women of all ages would wear the gargush; however, the design and material used would vary depending on marital status, locality, and occasion.

== Significance ==
The gargush was made to comply with the biblical mandate on married women covering their hair. It acts as a hood-like headpiece which extends onto the shoulders, and is closed under the chin by a button. The wearer's marital status was often signified by the jewelry and ornaments attached to the gargush. The materials used varied from black cotton and velvet (gadifah) to golden-threaded brocade (mizahhar).

The most decorated gargush among Jewish women in Sanaa was the gargush mizahhar mirassaf (the full golden hood), which was adorned with gilt silver filigree (made by Yemenite Jewish silversmiths) and gilt coins hanging on the exterior. It was usually part of a woman's dowry from her father. On the Sabbath and Jewish holidays, women would wear a variant known as gargush gadifah, which is made of black velvet, with silver decorations around the hood border.

Traditionally, in Yemenite Jewish culture, at the age of seven, a girl would wear her first gargush, typically a basic one with nominal silver decorations. Around the age of 12, she would receive a fancier costume and gargush. Bridal gargushes are viewed as elaborate headpieces, completely covered up by gold-patterned brocade laced with golden ornaments. After getting married, a woman was required to wear a gargush when outside or whenever visitors were present.

Outside of signifying modesty, gargushes were seen as sexual signals. Wearing fancy make-up while wearing a gargush was seen as showing sexual desire to her husband. In public, a woman would be viewed as promiscuous if her gargush was worn loose.
