= File (tool) =

Tool used to remove fine amounts of material

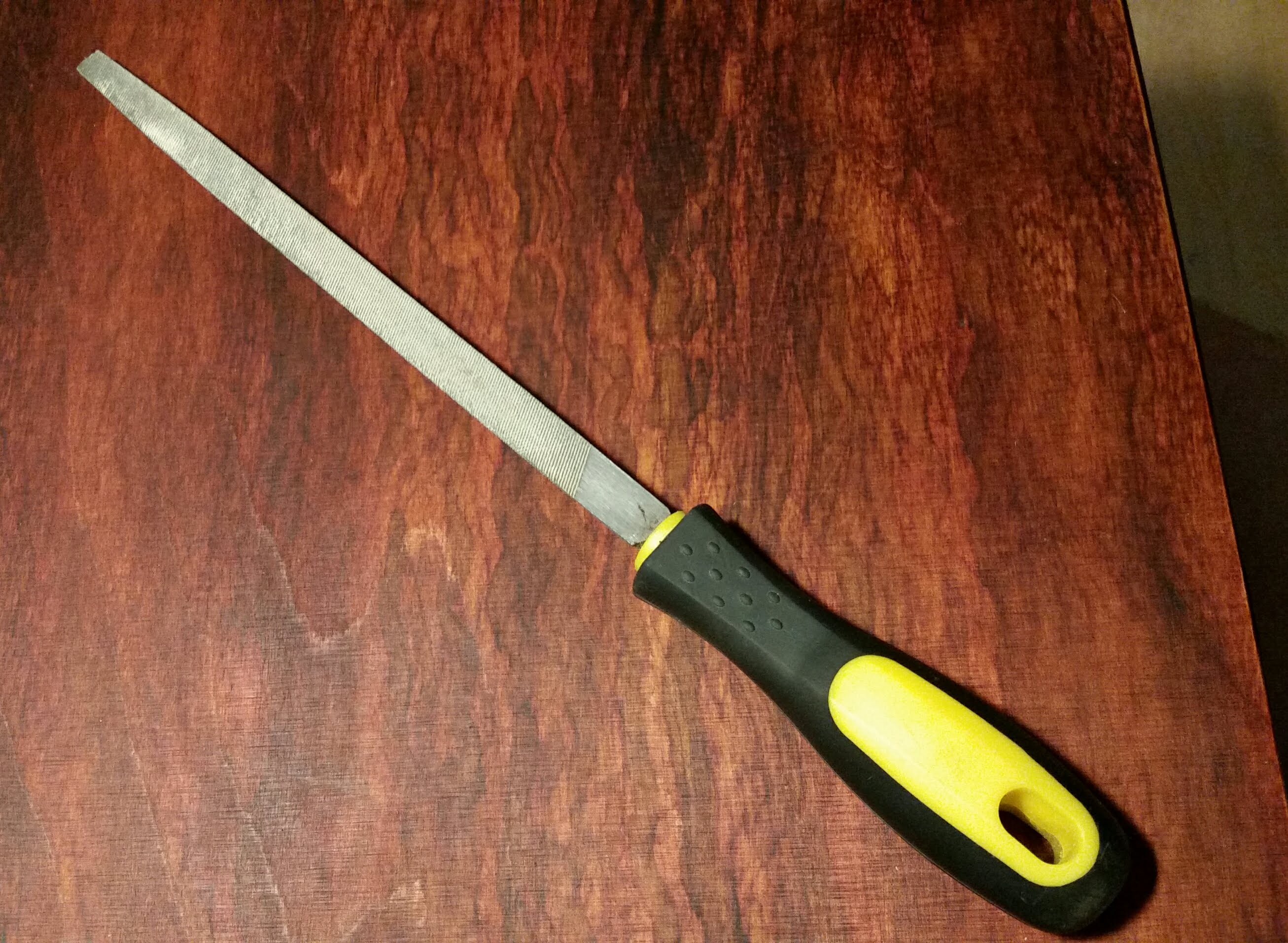
Photograph of a file on a wooden surface.

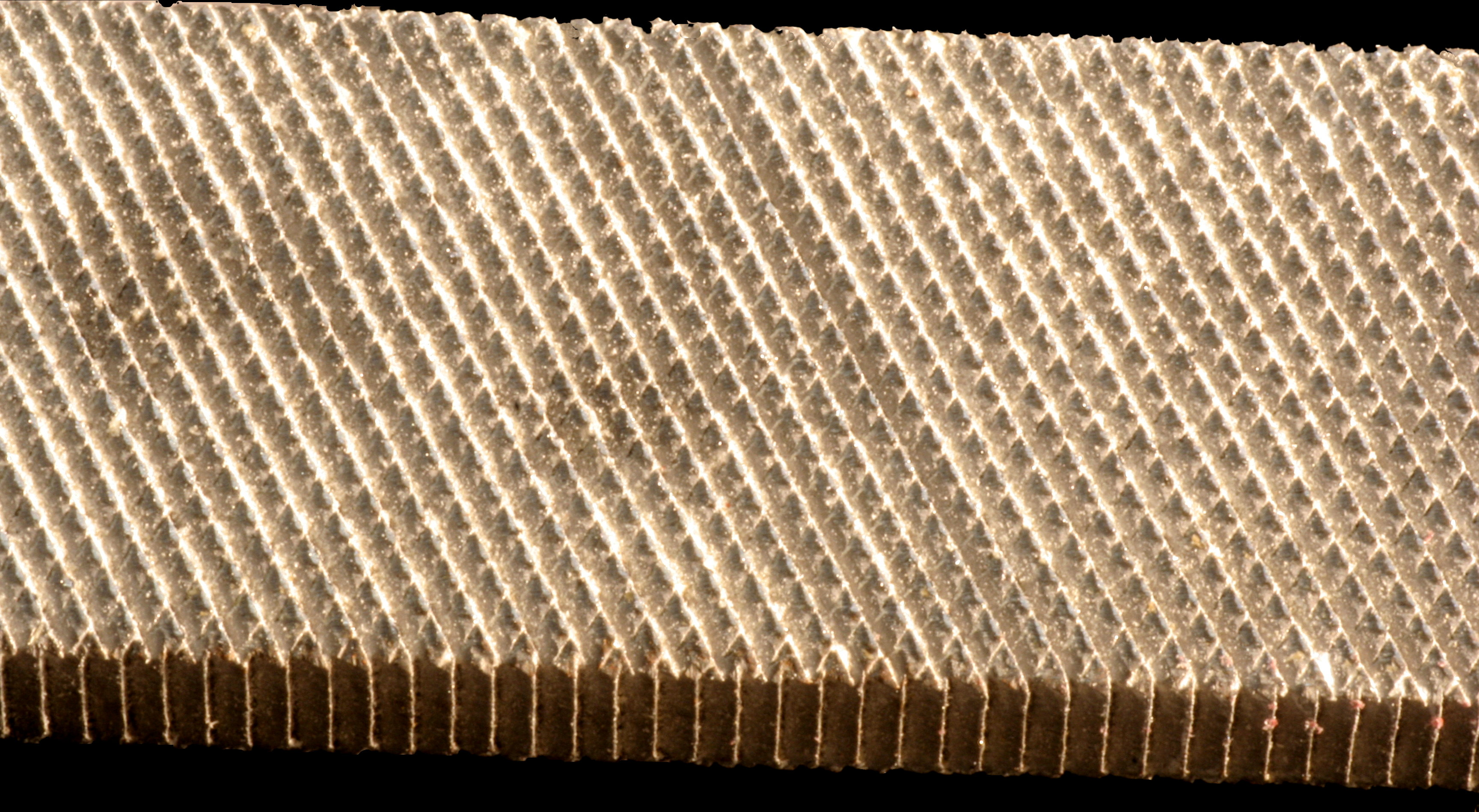
Detail of a double-cut flat file showing cutting surfaces on both wide and narrow faces

A file is a tool used to remove fine amounts of material from a workpiece. It is common in woodworking, metalworking, and other similar trade and hobby tasks. Most are hand tools, made of a case hardened steel bar of rectangular, square, triangular, or round cross-section, with one or more surfaces cut with sharp, generally parallel teeth. A narrow, pointed tang is common at one end, to which a handle may be fitted.

A rasp is a form of file with distinct, individually cut teeth used for coarsely removing large amounts of material.

Files have also been developed with abrasive surfaces, such as natural or synthetic diamond grains or silicon carbide, allowing removal of material that would dull or resist steel files, such as ceramic.

== History ==
Early filing or rasping has prehistoric roots and grew naturally out of the blending of the twin inspirations of cutting with stone cutting tools (such as hand axes) and abrading using natural abrasives, such as well-suited types of stone (for example, sandstone). Relatedly, lapping is also quite ancient, with wood and beach sand offering a natural pair of lap and lapping compound. The Disston authors state, "To abrade, or file, ancient man used sand, grit, coral, bone, fish skin, and gritty woods,—also stone of varying hardness in connection with sand and water."

The Bronze Age and the Iron Age had various kinds of files and rasps. Archaeologists have discovered rasps made from bronze in Egypt, dating back to the years 1200–1000 BC. Archaeologists have also discovered rasps made of iron used by the Assyrians, dating back to the 7th Century BC.

During the Middle Ages files were already quite advanced, thanks to the extensive talents of blacksmiths. By the 11th century, there already existed hardened files that would seem quite modern even to today's eyes. But although they existed, and could even have spread widely, in a geographical sense, via trade, they were not widespread in the cultural sense of the word—that is, most people, and even many smiths, did not have them. For example, in the 13th century, ornamental iron work at Paris was done skillfully with the aid of files, but the process was a secret known only to a master craftsman. The Disston authors state, "It was not until the fourteenth century, however, that those who practiced art in ironwork began to use other tools, besides heat and the hammer, regularly." This statement could mislead in the sense that stoning (with sandstone) and lapping (with wood, sand, and water) have never been rare activities among humans, or especially smiths. But the point is that modern iron or steel files, with teeth and hardening, and the material culture of intricate filing that would lead to locksmithing and gunsmithing, for example, are what took time to become common. But by the late Middle Ages, the transition was extensive. The Disston authors mention Nuremberg, Sheffield, and Remscheid (they use the Reimscheid spelling) as leading centers of production for files as well as tools in general. The activity in Remscheid reflects the metalworking spirit of the Rhine-Ruhr region in general (including Essen, Düsseldorf, and Cologne) rather than representing a single village of geniuses in isolation. (Considering the Disston authors' mention of the blacksmith guilds of 13th-century Florence and 15th-century England, coupled with their mention of Nuremberg, Sheffield, and Remscheid, the region that sweeps from Florence through Nuremberg, the Rhine-Ruhr, the Netherlands, and up to Sheffield, can be compared to the modern economics notation of the Blue Banana.) Most files of the period were smithed by hand in a sequence in which the iron was forged (heated and hammered), then the teeth were cut with a chisel (some of this action was just as much upsetting/swaging as it was cutting), and then the piece was hardened (by heating and then quenching), followed sometimes by tempering. Among the drawings of Leonardo da Vinci is a sketch of a machine tool for the cutting of files (the chisel would make one strike, swaging a tooth, then automatically advance into position for the next tooth, and strike again).

Prior to the industrialization of machining and the development of interchangeable parts during the 19th century, filing was much more important in the construction of mechanisms. Component parts were roughly shaped by forging, casting, and by primitive machining operations. These components were then individually hand-fitted for assembly by careful and deliberate filing. The potential precision of such fitting is much higher than generally assumed, but the components of such hand-fit assemblies are decidedly not interchangeable with those from another assembly. Locks, clocks, and firearms (flintlocks and earlier) were manufactured in this way for centuries before the Industrial Revolution.

Machining in the mid-19th century was heavily dependent on filing, because milling practice was slowly evolving out of its infancy. As late as the early 20th century, manufacturing often involved filing parts to precise shape and size. In today's manufacturing environment, milling and grinding have generally replaced this type of work, and filing (when it occurs at all) usually tends to be for deburring only. Skillful filing to shape and size is still a part of diemaking, moldmaking, toolmaking, etc., but even in those fields, the goal is usually to avoid handwork when possible.

== Types ==
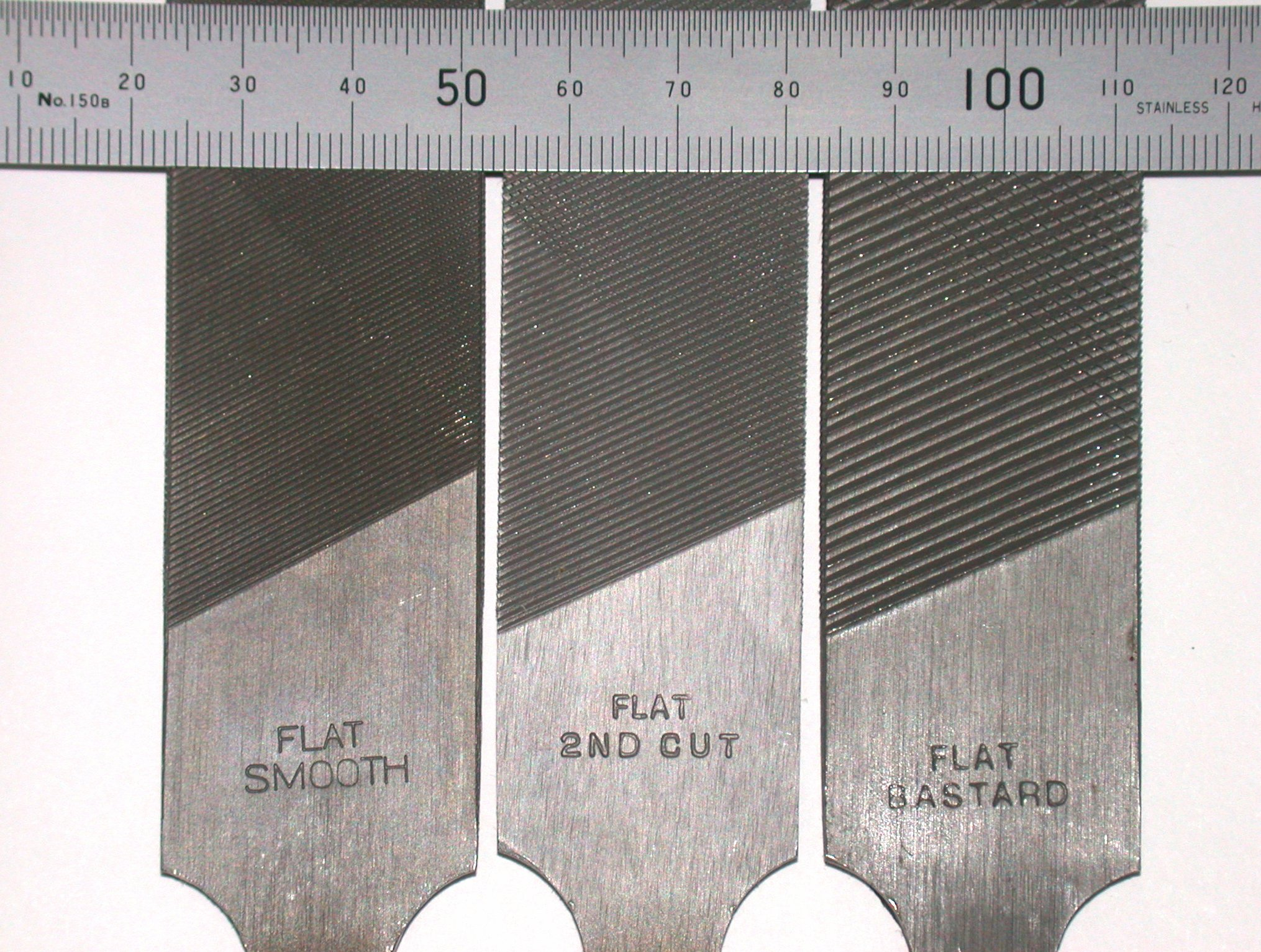
Relative tooth sizes for smooth, 2nd cut and bastard files

Files come in a wide variety of materials, sizes, shapes, cuts, and tooth configurations. The cross-section of a file can be flat, round, half-round, triangular, square, knife edge or of a more specialized shape. Steel files are made from high carbon steel (1.0 to 1.25% carbon) and may be through hardened or case hardened.

There is no unitary international standard for file nomenclature; however, there are many generally accepted names for certain kinds of files. A file is "blunt" if its sides and width are both parallel throughout its length. It is "tapered" if there is a reduction in its dimensions from its heel toward its point. A file may taper in width, in thickness, or both. A "tang" is a protrusion at the heel, tapered, parallel sided, or conical, for gripping, inserting in a handle, or mounting in a chuck.

The cut of the file refers to how fine its teeth are. They are defined as (from roughest to smoothest): rough, middle, bastard, second cut, smooth, and dead smooth. A single-cut file has one set of parallel teeth while a cross-cut or double-cut file has a second set of cuts forming diamond shaped cutting surfaces. In Swiss-pattern files the teeth are cut at a shallower angle, and are graded by number, with a number 1 file being coarser than a number 2, etc. Most files have teeth on all faces, but some specialty flat files have teeth on only one face or one edge, so that the user can come right up to another edge without damaging the finish on it.

Some of the common shapes and their uses:

File Types and Uses
Name	Image	Description
Mill file		The most common shape, single-cut, rectangular in cross section, with an even thickness throughout their length; they may be either parallel sided or taper slightly in width from heel to end
Flat file		Similar to a mill file, but may be double-cut
Hand file		Parallel in width and tapered in thickness, used for general work
Square file		Gradually tapered and cut on all four sides. Used for a wide variety of tasks
Three square/Triangular file		Triangular in cross-section, which may taper gradually, often to a point on smaller files. The sides may be equal in cross-section, or have two long and one short surface
Rat tail		Round in cross-section and gradually tapered over their length. They are used for enlarging round holes or cutting scalloped edges
Round		Round in cross section and equal diameter over their length (not tapered). They are used for smoothing inside holes and circular grooves, and for sharpening certain kinds of saw.
Half round file		Has one flat and one convex surface, and either tapering slightly or maintaining an even thickness, width, or both over their length
Combination file		Tangless, flat sided or half-round, with two to four cutting surfaces, typically including a combination of single cut, double cut, or rasp

- Barrette files are tapered in width and thickness, coming to a rounded point at the end. Only the flat side is cut, and the other sides are all safe. For doing flat work.
- Checkering files parallel in width and gently tapered in thickness. They have teeth cut in a precise grid pattern, and are used for making serrations and doing checkering work, as on gunstocks.
- Crochet files are tapered in width and gradually tapered in thickness, with two flats and radiused edges, cut all around. Used in filing junctions between flat and curved surface, and slots with rounded edges.
- Crossing files are half round on two sides with one side having a larger radius than the other. Tapered in width and thickness. For filing interior curved surfaces. The double radius makes possible filing at the junction of two curved surfaces or a straight and curved surface.
- Dreadnought (curved teeth) and millenicut (straight teeth) files both have heavily undercut, sharp but coarse teeth. Both can be used for rapidly removing large quantities of material from thick aluminum alloy, copper or brass. Today, the millenicut and dreadnought have found a new use in removing plastic filler materials such as two-part epoxies or styrenes such as those commonly used in automobile body repairs.
- Equalling files are parallel in width and thickness. Used for filing slots and corners.
- Farrier Rasp files are tanged rasps used mainly by farriers and blacksmiths. They are flat with a rasp on one side and double cut on the reverse.
- Fret files are square or rectangular with three flat sides and one side having a concave groove. They are used by luthiers to file a rounded "crown" on the frets of guitars and other fretted instruments. The flat faces are used to dress the ends of the frets, removing the sharp edges left after the frets are trimmed to length.
- Half round ring files taper in width and thickness, coming to a point, and are narrower than a standard half round. Used for filing inside of rings.
- Joint round edge files are parallel in width and thickness, with rounded edges. The flats are safe (no teeth) and cut on the rounded edges only. Used for making joints and hinges.
- Knife files are tapered in width and thickness, but the knife edge has the same thickness the whole length, with the knife edge having an arc to it. Used for slotting or wedging operations.
- Nut files are fine, precise files in sets of graduated thickness, used by luthiers for dressing the slots at the end of the neck which support the strings of guitars, violins etc., in the correct position.
- Pillar files are parallel in width and tapered in thickness for perfectly flat filing. Double cut top and bottom with both sides safe, these are long, narrow files for precision work.
- Pippin files are tapered in width and thickness, generally of a teardrop cross section and having the edge of a knife file. Used for filing the junction of two curved surfaces and making V-shaped slots.
- Planemaker's float Floats are straight, single-cut files which taper used for cutting, flattening and smoothing wood, particularly in making wooden hand planes.
- Round parallel files are similar to round files, except that they do not taper. Shaped like a toothed cylinder.
- Saw sharpening files are usually single cut to deliver a smooth finish. They are suited to sharpening saw blades and dressing tool edges, especially where a finer, sharper edge or smoother surface finish is desired. The Chainsaw file is one example, used primarily for sharpening chainsaws. These appear to have a round cross-section, but are actually shaped to fit snugly against the cutting edge of a chainsaw's teeth.
- Slitting files are parallel in width with a diamond-shaped cross section. Thinner than knife files and use for filing slots.
- Warding files are parallel in thickness, tapered in width, and thin. Like a hand or flat file that comes to a point on the end. Used for flat work and slotting.

=== Diamond files ===
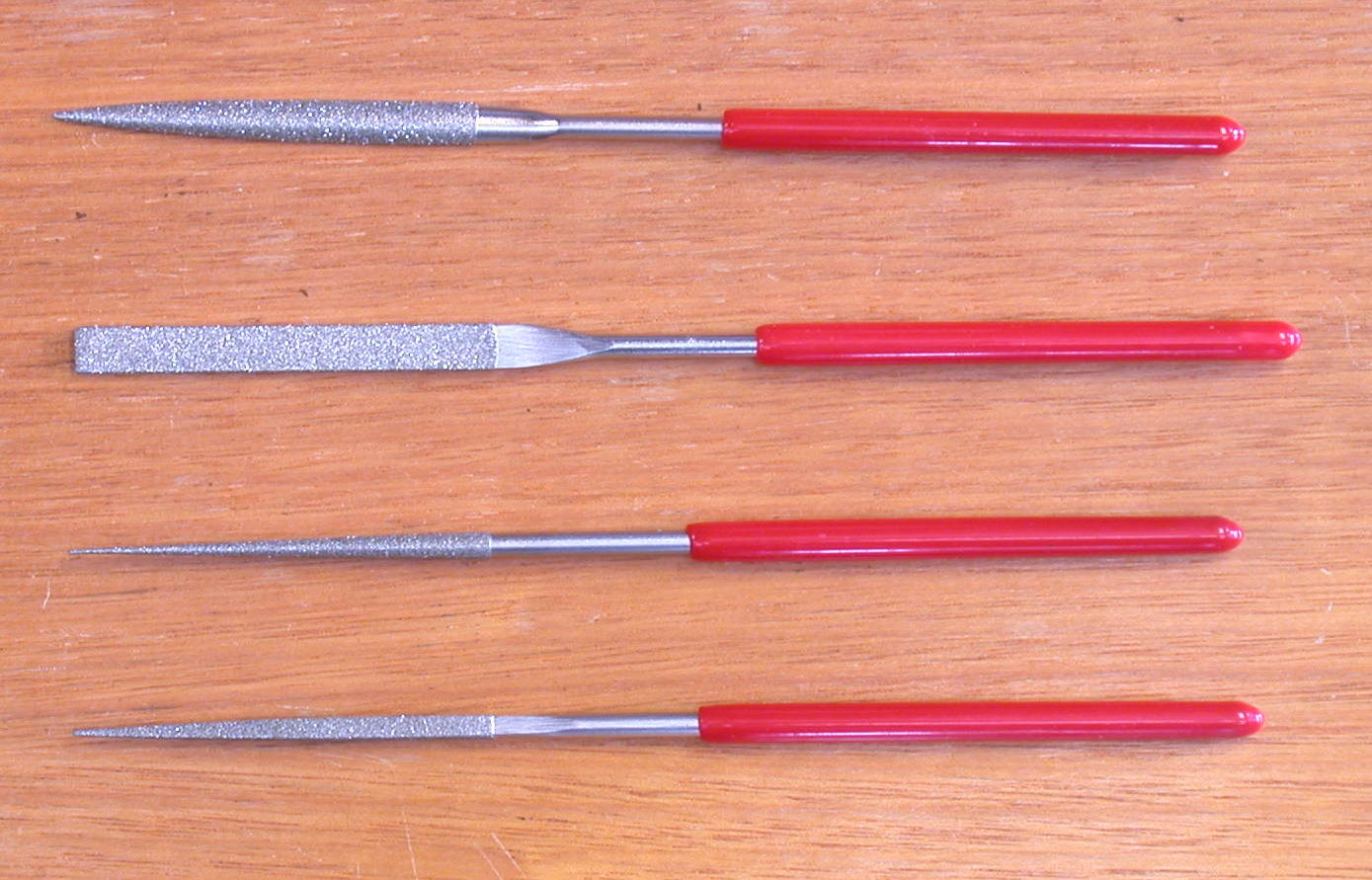
A selection of diamond impregnated files

Instead of having teeth cut into the file's working surface, diamond files have small particles of industrial diamond embedded in their surface (or into a softer material that is bonded to the underlying surface of the file). The use of diamonds in this manner allows the file to be used effectively against extremely hard materials, such as stone, glass or very hard metals such as hardened steel or carbide against which a standard steel file is ineffective. Diamond files are also the only type that may be used with a back-and-forth motion without damaging the file. These may also be called diamond laps, as the "teeth" are not regular projections, as in a file, but particles, usually shaped and located randomly and held in place by a softer (any other) material.

=== Needle files ===
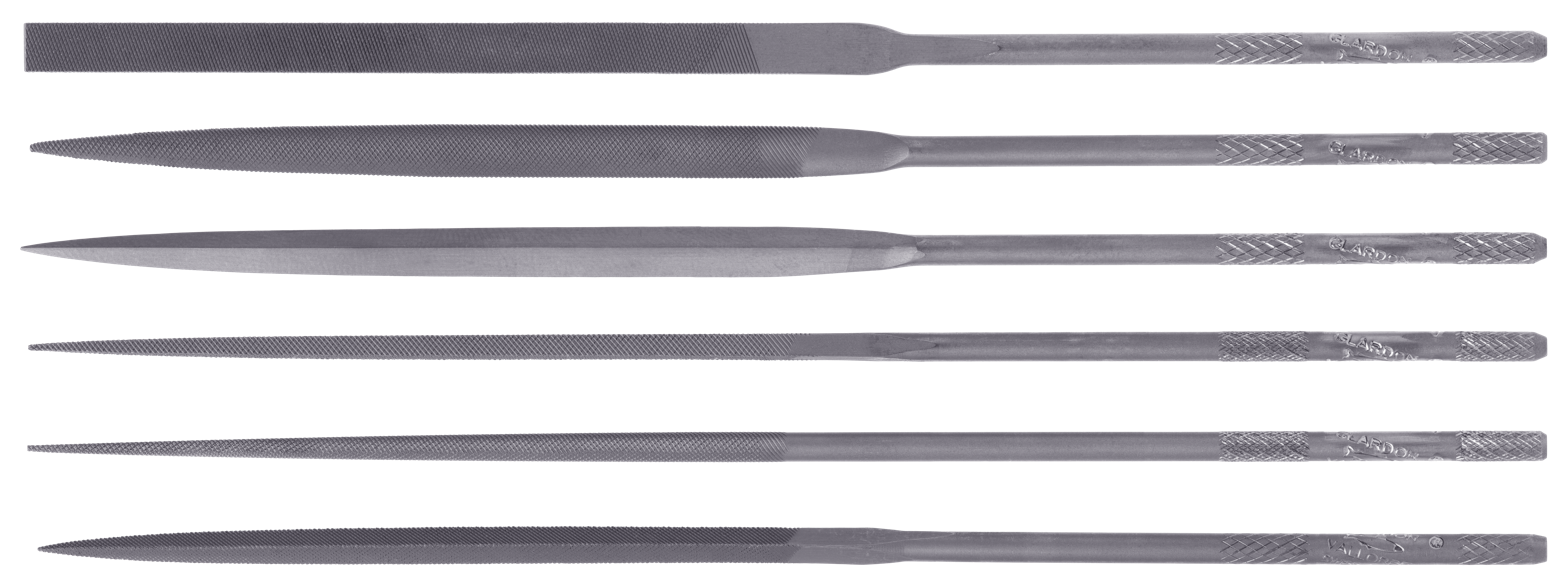
A needle file set depicting various shapes, from top to bottom: pillar, half round, barrette, square, round, triangular.

The image to the left shows a selection of needle files in an assortment of cross sectional shapes.

Needle files are small files that are used in applications where the surface finish takes priority over metal removal rates but they are most suited for smaller work pieces. They are often sold in sets, including different shapes.

=== Riffler files ===
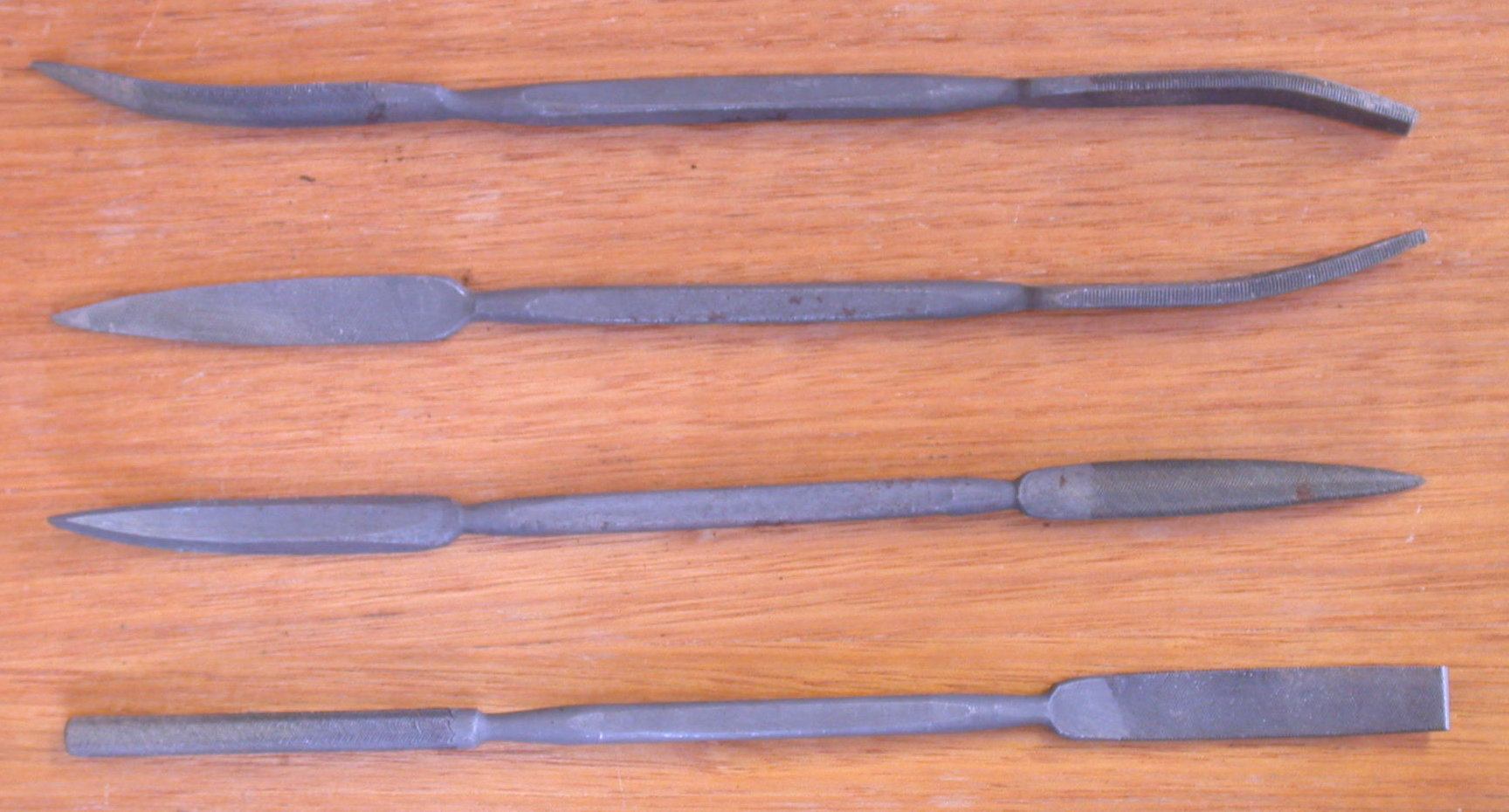
A selection of riffler files

Riffler files are small to medium-sized files in an assortment of cross sectional shapes and profiles. The varying profiles and shapes enable them to be used in hard to reach, or unusually shaped areas. They are often used as an intermediate step in die making where the surface finish of a cavity die may need to be improved, e.g. in plastic injection moulding or die casting.

=== Machine files ===
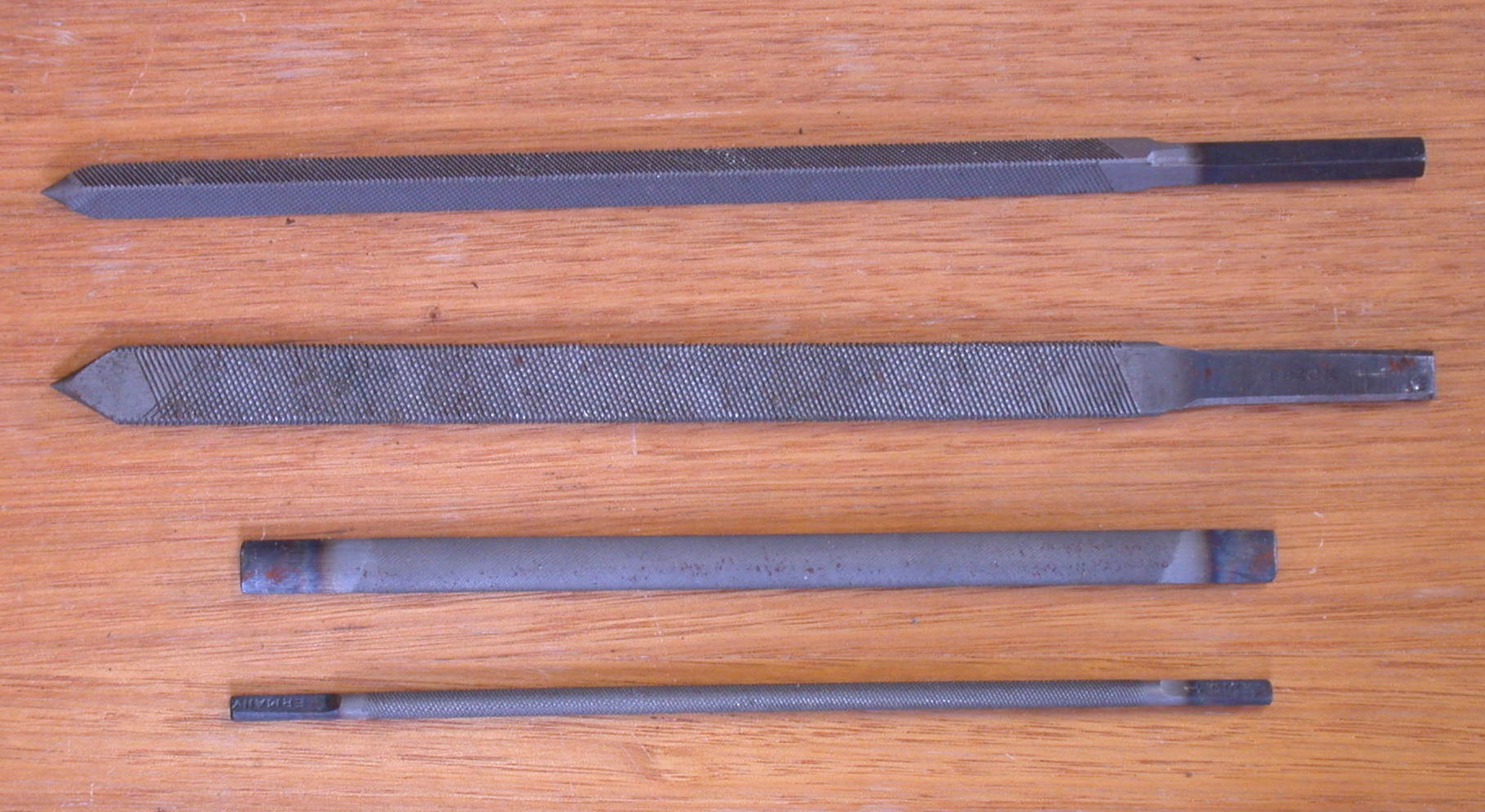
A selection of machine files

Files are produced specifically for use in a filing machine, which is similar in appearance to a scroll saw with a vertically reciprocating file mounted in the middle of a table. A workpiece is manipulated around the file's face as the shape requires.

A cone point (as pictured in the top and bottom files at left) allows a file to center itself in its mount. Files with flat mounting surfaces must be secured with set screws.

Filing machines are rarely seen in modern production environments, but may be found in older toolrooms or diemaking shops as an aid in the manufacture of specialist tooling.

=== Escapement files ===
Escapement files, also known as watchmaker's files, are a classification of short, (very) thin files with bastard-cut (medium coarseness) or embedded diamond surfaces, similar to needle files in form and function but smaller. Typical dimensions are on the order of approximately 100–140 mm (4–5 1/2 in.) in length and 3–5 mm (1/8–3/16 in.) in width. Best used for fine, delicate work on small pieces or mechanisms (such as escapements), escapement files are commonly used by clock and watchmakers, as well as in crafting jewelry.

=== Dental files ===
During root canal therapy, round files ranging from .06-to-0.8-millimetre (0.0024 to 0.0315 in) diameter files are used to smooth the narrow canals of the interior of the tooth and thus facilitate disinfection of the internal surface. Typically the files are made of stainless steel or nickel titanium (NiTi) and come in a variety of styles. Mechanized files, known as rotary files, are also commonly used. These files attach to the head of a specific oscillating or rotating drill.

== Use ==
Files have forward-facing cutting teeth, and cut most effectively when pushed over the workpiece. A variety of strokes are employed to stabilize the cutting action and produce a varied result. Draw filing is an operation in which the file is grasped at each end, and with an even pressure alternately pulled and pushed perpendicularly over the work. A variation involves laying the file sideways on the work, and carefully pushing or pulling it across the work. This catches the teeth of the file sideways instead of head on, and an extremely fine shaving action is produced. There are also varying strokes that produce a combination of the straight ahead stroke and the drawfiling stroke, and very fine work can be attained in this fashion. Using a combination of strokes, and progressively finer files, a skilled operator can attain a surface that is perfectly flat and near flawless finish.

Pinning refers to the clogging of the file teeth with pins, which are material shavings. These pins cause the file to lose its cutting ability and can scratch the workpiece. A file card, which is a brush with metal bristles, is used to clean the file. (The name, "card", is the same as used for the "raising cards" (spiked brushes) used in woolmaking.) Chalk can help prevent pinning.

== See also ==
- Hand scraper
- Rasp
