= Float (woodworking) =

Metal file used for making wooden hand planes

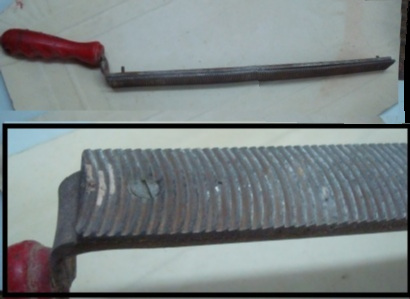
Float

A woodworking float (more rarely used in silversmithing), also called a planemaker's float, is a tapered, flat, single cut file of two types: edge float and the flat sided float which are traditional woodworking tools generally used when making a wooden plane. The float is used to cut, flatten, and smooth (or float) key areas of wood by abrasion. Its woodworking uses go well beyond planemaking.

Floats are similar to rasps and files. Rasps are generally coarse and cannot be resharpened. Files have angled ridges or teeth and cannot be resharpened. Floats have parallel teeth and they can be resharpened as many times as the thickness of the blade will allow.

Edge floats resemble saw blades and are generally used to cut wedge slots in wood. Flat sided floats are more similar to a file or rasp but their cutting edges are a series of parallel teeth.

Types of woodworking floats include: joiner's float, bed float, side float.
