= 1481 Rhodes earthquake =

Magnitude 7 earthquake

- Location within Greece
- Local date: 3 May 1481
- Local time: 03:00
- Magnitude: M_{s} 7.1
- Epicenter: 36.0°N 28.0°E
- Areas affected: Greece, Rhodes
- Max. intensity: MMI X (Extreme)
- Tsunami: Yes
- Casualties: 30,000 fatalities

The 1481 Rhodes earthquake occurred at 3:00 in the morning on 3 May. It triggered a small tsunami, which caused local flooding. There were an estimated 30,000 fatalities. It was the largest of a series of earthquakes that affected Rhodes, starting on 15 March 1481, continuing until January 1482.

== Tectonic setting ==
The island of Rhodes lies on part of the boundary between the Aegean Sea and African plates. The tectonic setting is complex, with a Neogene history that includes periods of thrusting, extension and strike slip. It sits in what is known as the Hellenic arc, which is in an area that is highly vulnerable to seismic activity, and historically always has been, dating back to the 226 BC Rhodes earthquake. Currently the island of Rhodes is undergoing a counter-clockwise rotation (17° ±5° in the last 800,000 years) associated with the south Aegean sinistral strike-slip fault system. The island had also been tilted to the northwest during the Pleistocene, an uplift attributed to a reverse fault lying just to the east of Rhodes.

== Damage ==
Sources refer to destruction in Rhodes Town; the Palace of the Grand Master of the Knights of Rhodes was sufficiently damaged to require immediate rebuilding (Rhodes was at the time under siege by the Turks). The damage caused by the earthquakes led to a wave of rebuilding after 1481. Damage from the tsunami was said to be greater than from the earthquake. The tsunami caused a large ship to break free from its moorings. It (or another ship) later sank with loss of all its crew after running onto a reef. There were an estimated 30,000 fatalities.

Reports of an earthquake felt an hour past noon on the seventeenth day of Muharram in Egypt may have been the effects of this earthquake. Shaking in Cairo was described as "severe", and minarets were observed swaying. A cresting on the Salihiyya Madrasa collapsed, killing two people. Reports of shaking also came from Fustat, Alexandria and Asia Minor.

== Characteristics ==
=== Tsunami ===
The tsunami appears to have been relatively minor, estimated at a maximum 1.8 m. However, it was observed on the Levantine coasts and a tsunami sediment layer found at Dalaman, on the southwest coast of Turkey. Although the studies on sediment transport from tsunamis are limited, it is probable that the tsunami can be dated 1473 ± 46. The sediment found and studied appears to be consistent with the aforementioned tsunami.

=== Earthquake ===
There was a major foreshock on 15 March of that year. Following the mainshock on 3 May, earthquakes (presumably aftershocks) continued until January 1482, with large aftershocks on 5 May 12 May, 3 October and 18 December. The estimated magnitude for the mainshock is 7.1 on the surface-wave magnitude scale. The maximum seismic intensity was estimated at IX–X, while intensity VII was observed in Cairo.
