= Palace of the Grand Master of the Knights of Rhodes =

Palace in Rhodes, Greece

Palace of the Grand Master
- Παλάτι του Μεγάλου Μαγίστρου
- Part of the fortifications of Rhodes
- Rhodes, Greece
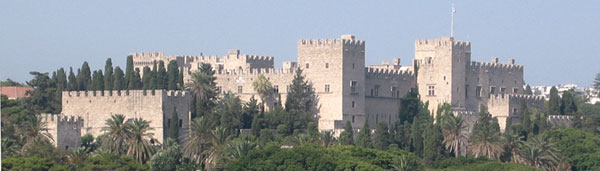
- View of the castle

Site information
- Type: Castle
- Owner: Government of Greece
- Open to the public: Yes
- Condition: Intact

Location
- Coordinates: 36°26′44.5″N 28°13′26.8″E

Site history
- Built: 7th century (citadel); 14th century (palace); 1937–1940 (restoration works)
- Built by: Byzantine Empire; Knights Hospitaller; Kingdom of Italy (restoration works)
- Architect: Vittorio Mesturino (20C reconstruction)
- Battles/wars: Siege of Rhodes (1480); Siege of Rhodes (1522)
- Events: 1481 Rhodes earthquake

UNESCO World Heritage Site
- Type: Cultural
- Criteria: ii, iv, v
- Designated: 1988 (12th session)
- Part of: Medieval old town of Rhodes
- Reference no.: 493
- Region: Europe and North America

The Palace of the Grand Master of the Knights of Rhodes, also known as the Kastello (Greek: Καστέλο, from Italian: Castello, "castle"), is a medieval castle in the city of Rhodes, on the island of Rhodes in Greece. It is one of the few examples of Gothic architecture in Greece. The site was previously a citadel of the Knights Hospitaller that functioned as a palace, headquarters, and fortress.

== History ==
According to recent study, in the exact spot in which the palace exists today, there was the foundations of the ancient temple of the sun god Helios, and probably that was the spot where the Colossus of Rhodes stood in the Antiquity. The palace was originally built in the late 7th century as a Byzantine citadel. After the Knights Hospitaller occupied Rhodes and some other Greek islands (such as Kalymnos and Kastellorizo) in 1309, they converted the fortress into their administrative centre and the palace of their Grand Master. In the first quarter of the 14th century, they repaired the palace and made a number of major modifications. The palace was damaged in the earthquake of 1481, and it was repaired soon afterwards.

After the 1522 capture of the island by the Ottoman Empire, the palace was used as a command centre and fortress.

In 1856, a gunpowder magazine under the nearby Church of Saint John – possibly stored there since the siege of 1522 – was struck by lightning, causing a massive explosion that killed many people, destroyed the church, and destroyed much of the Grand Master's Palace. Most of the upper floors collapsed, while the ground floor rooms survived.

During the Italian rule of Rhodes, the Ottoman-era structures of the former palace were demolished and the authorities asked architect Vittorio Mesturino, a recognized expert of medieval architecture and historical preservation, to design the reconstruction of the palace as well as in the nearby Street of the Knights of Rhodes. Despite the lack of remains or documentation from the pre-Ottoman era, Mestrino opted to re-create a structure that also suited the Italian authorities' need for a functional government building that would benefit from the aura of the Hospitaller legacy. The construction works took place between 1937 and 1940. Mesturino's work has been criticized for shortcomings such as its inherent lack of historical accuracy and unnecessary alterations to the authentic remains of the castle, being even characterized by one scholar as "horrendous fascist taste". The castle became a holiday residence for the King of Italy, Victor Emmanuel III, and later for Fascist dictator Benito Mussolini, whose name can still be seen on a large plaque near the entrance.

On 10 February 1947, the Treaty of Peace with Italy, one of the Paris Peace Treaties, determined that the recently established Italian Republic would transfer the Dodecanese Islands to Greece. In 1948, Rhodes and the rest of the Dodecanese were transferred as previously agreed. The palace was then converted to a museum, and is today visited by the millions of tourists that visit Rhodes.

In 1988, when Greece held the rotating presidency of the European Economic Community (as the European Union was then known), Greek Prime Minister Andreas Papandreou and the other leaders of the EEC held a meeting in the Palace.

== Gallery ==
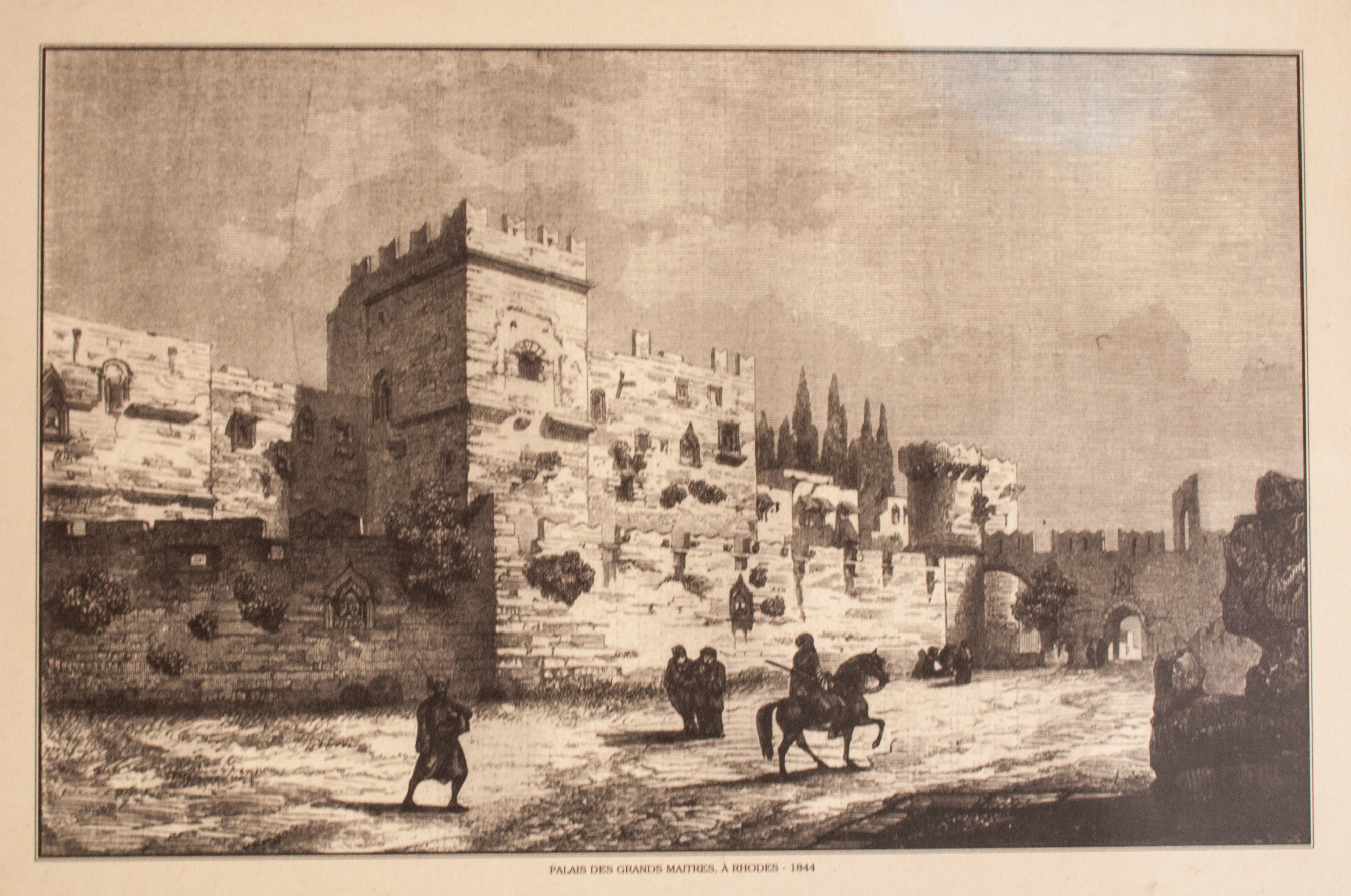
The palace in 1844

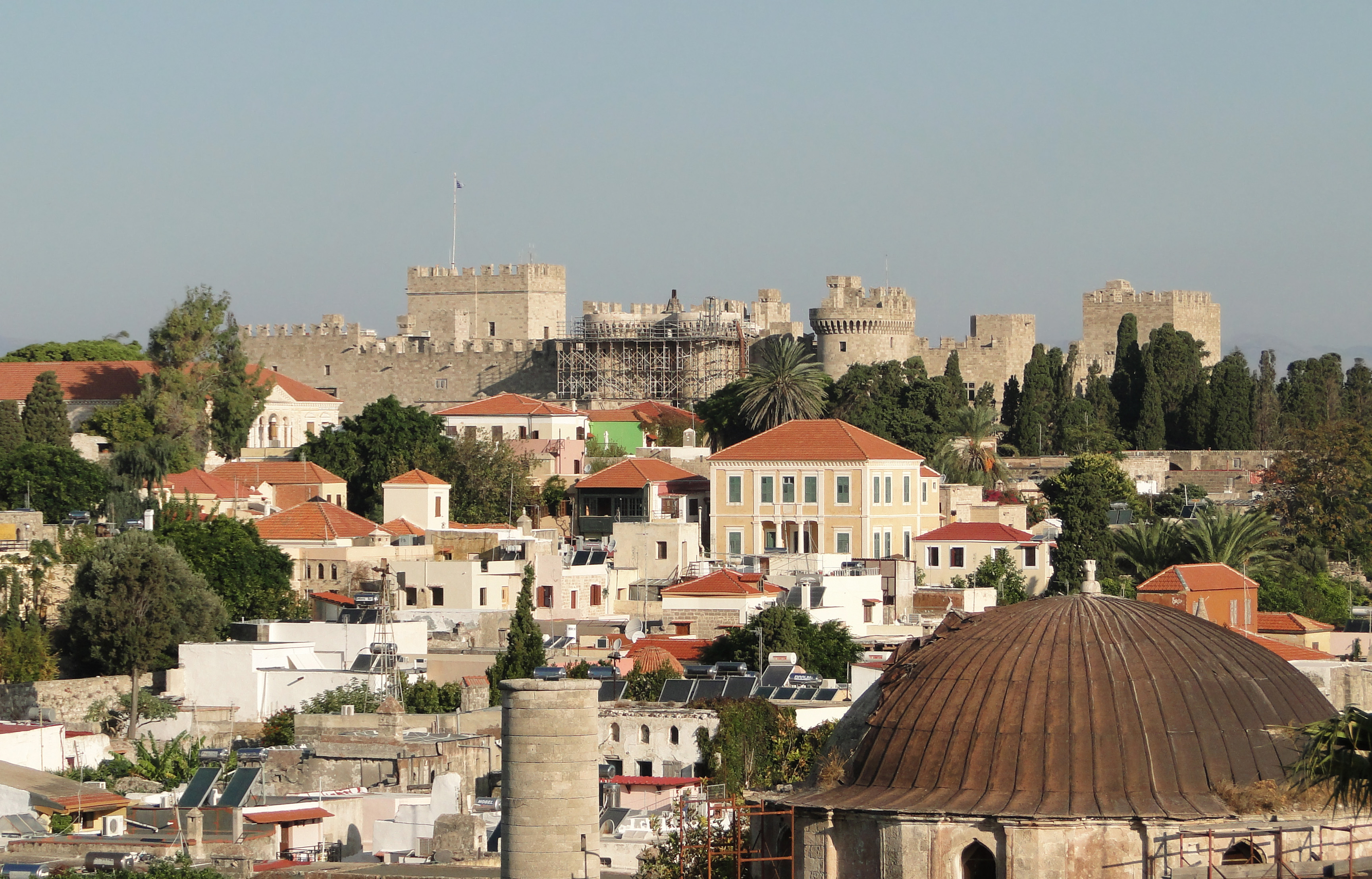
The castle overlooking the medieval town

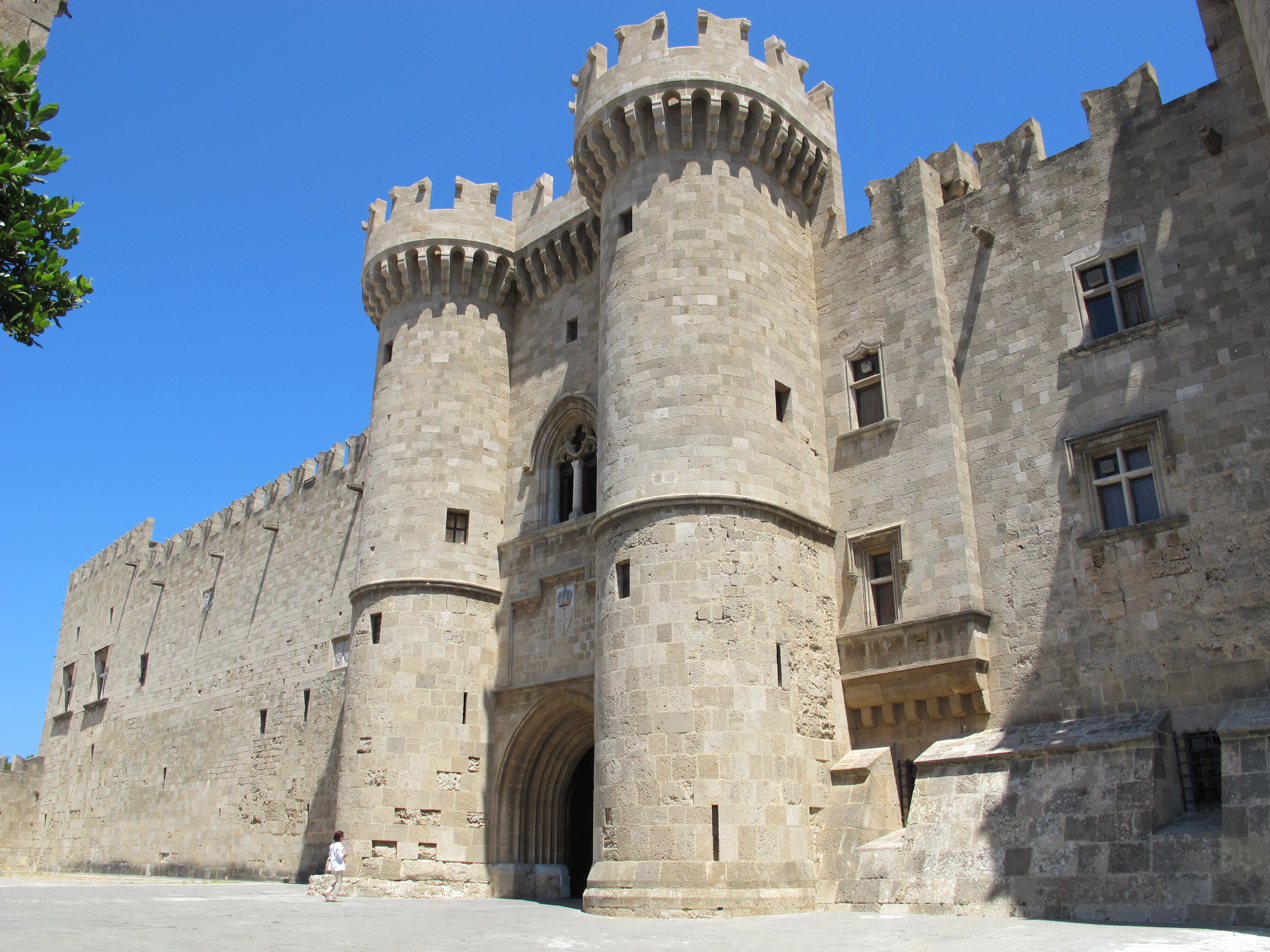
The main entrance

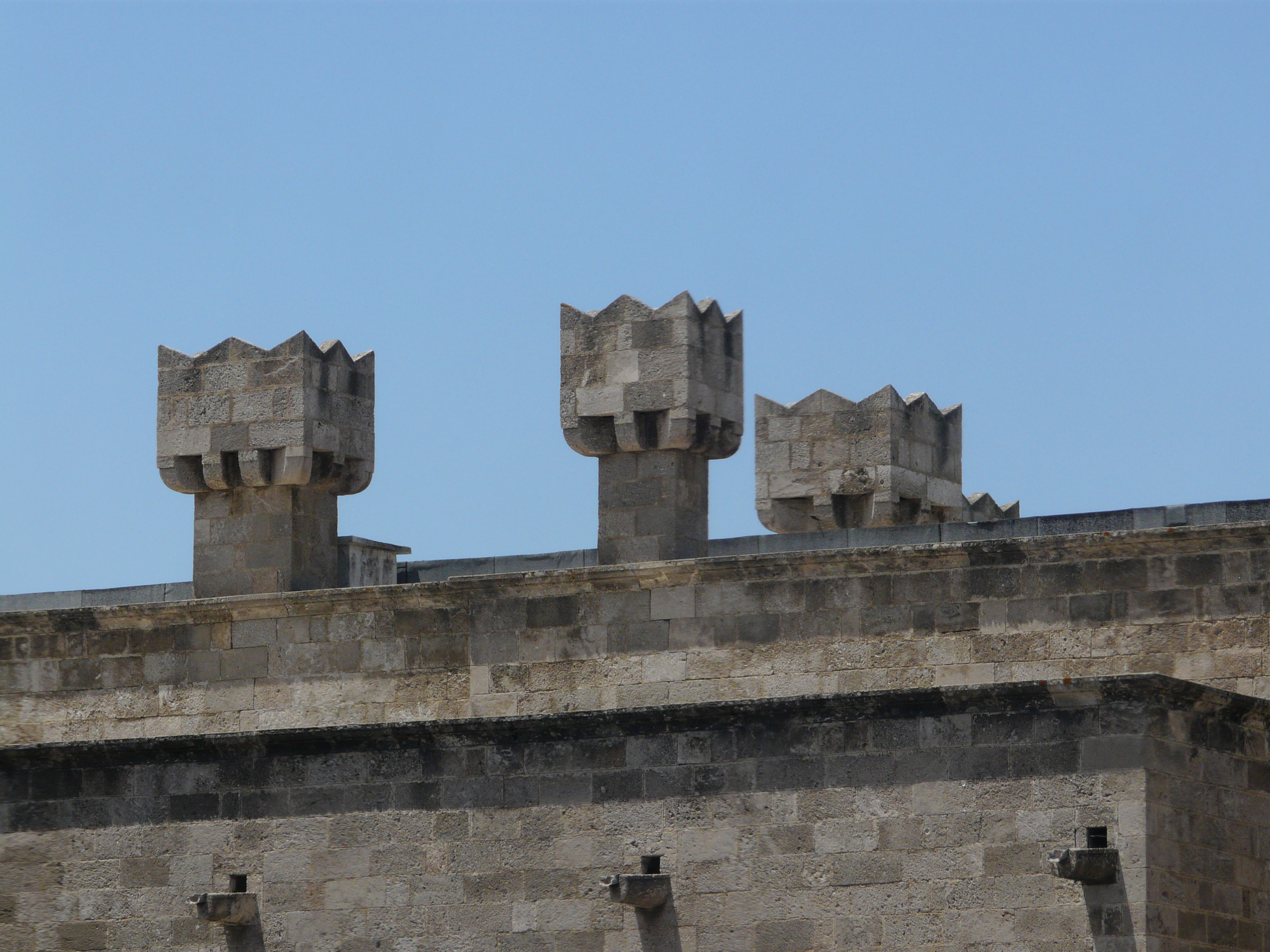
Chimneys

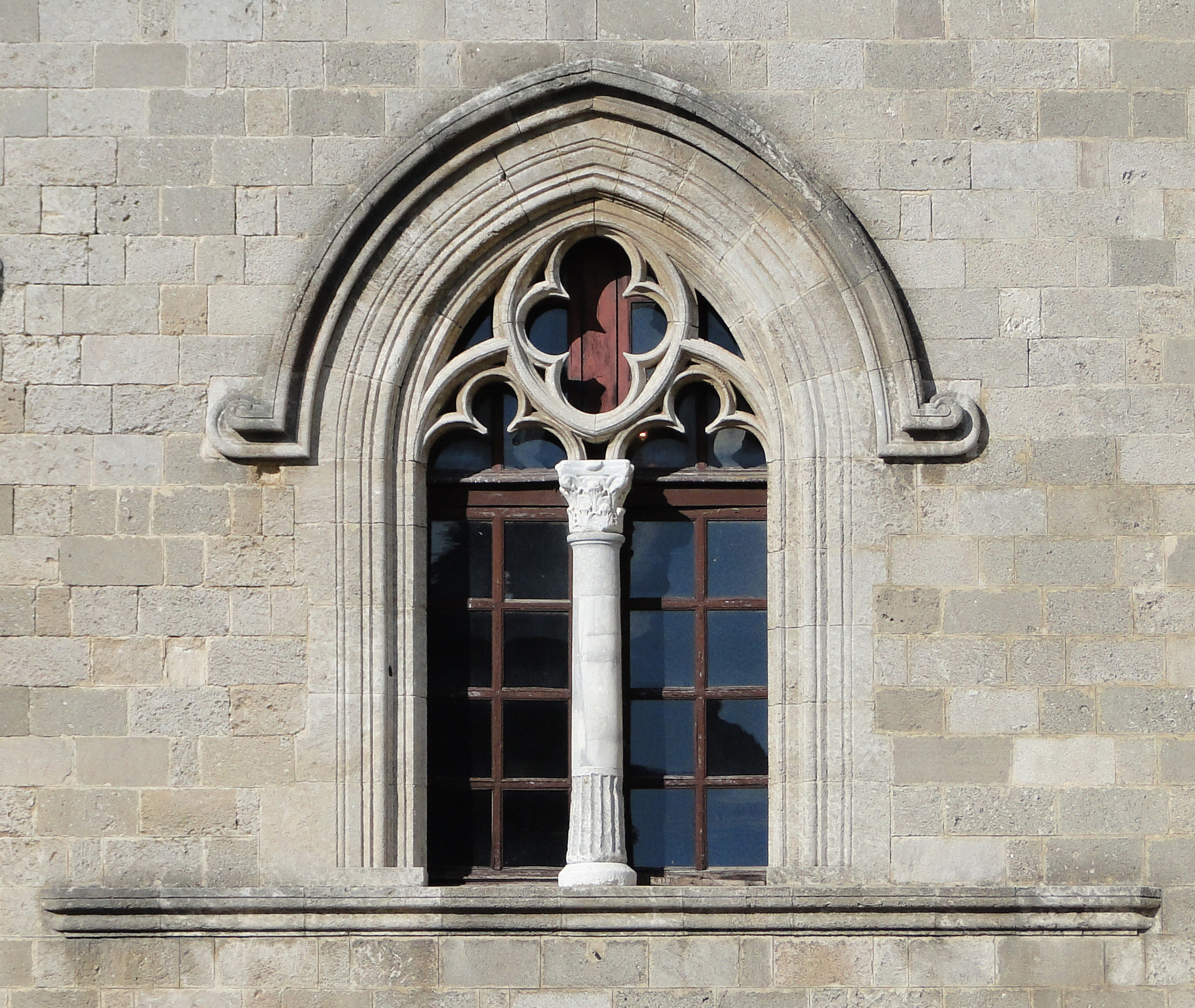
Detail

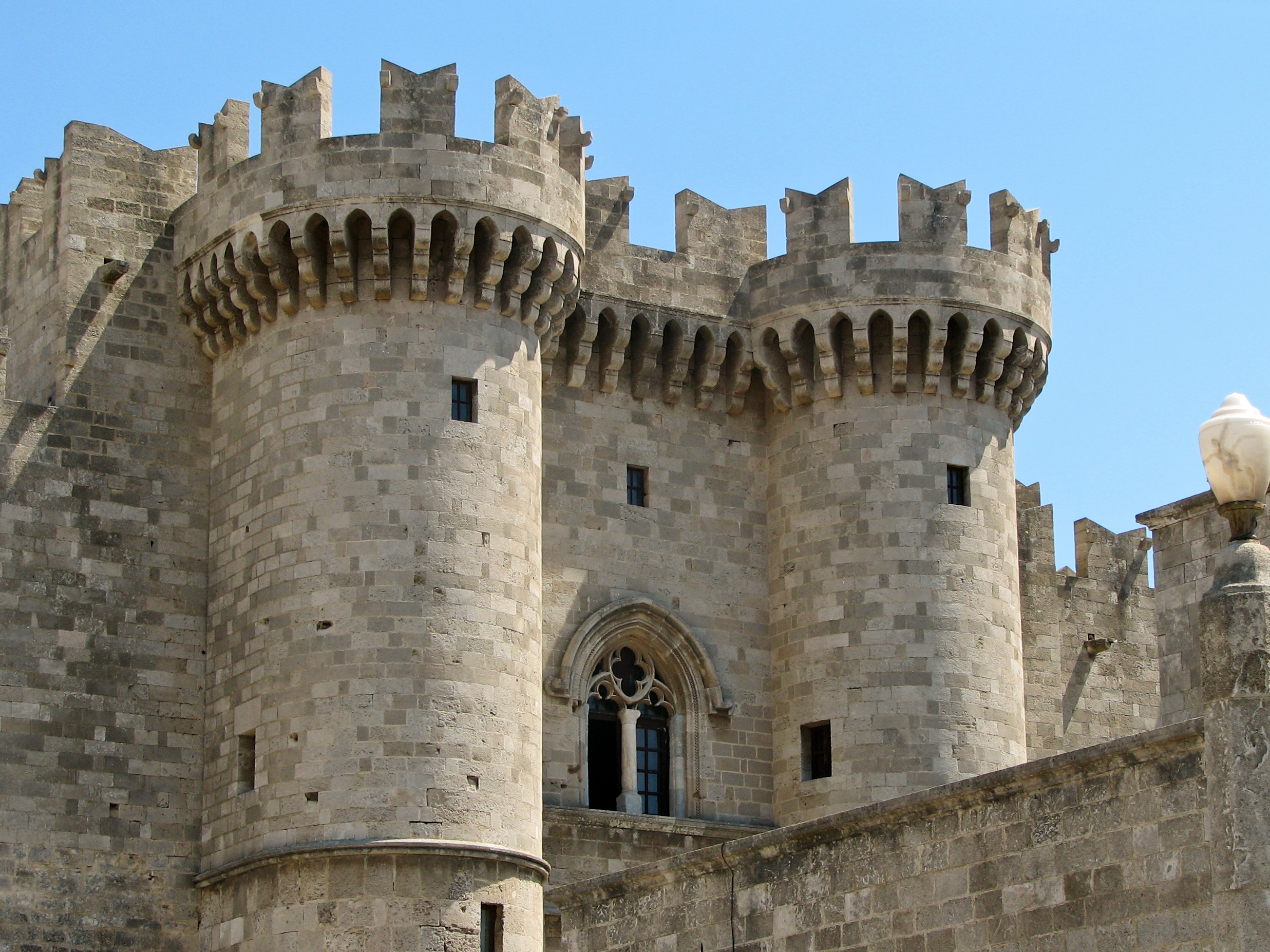
Close view

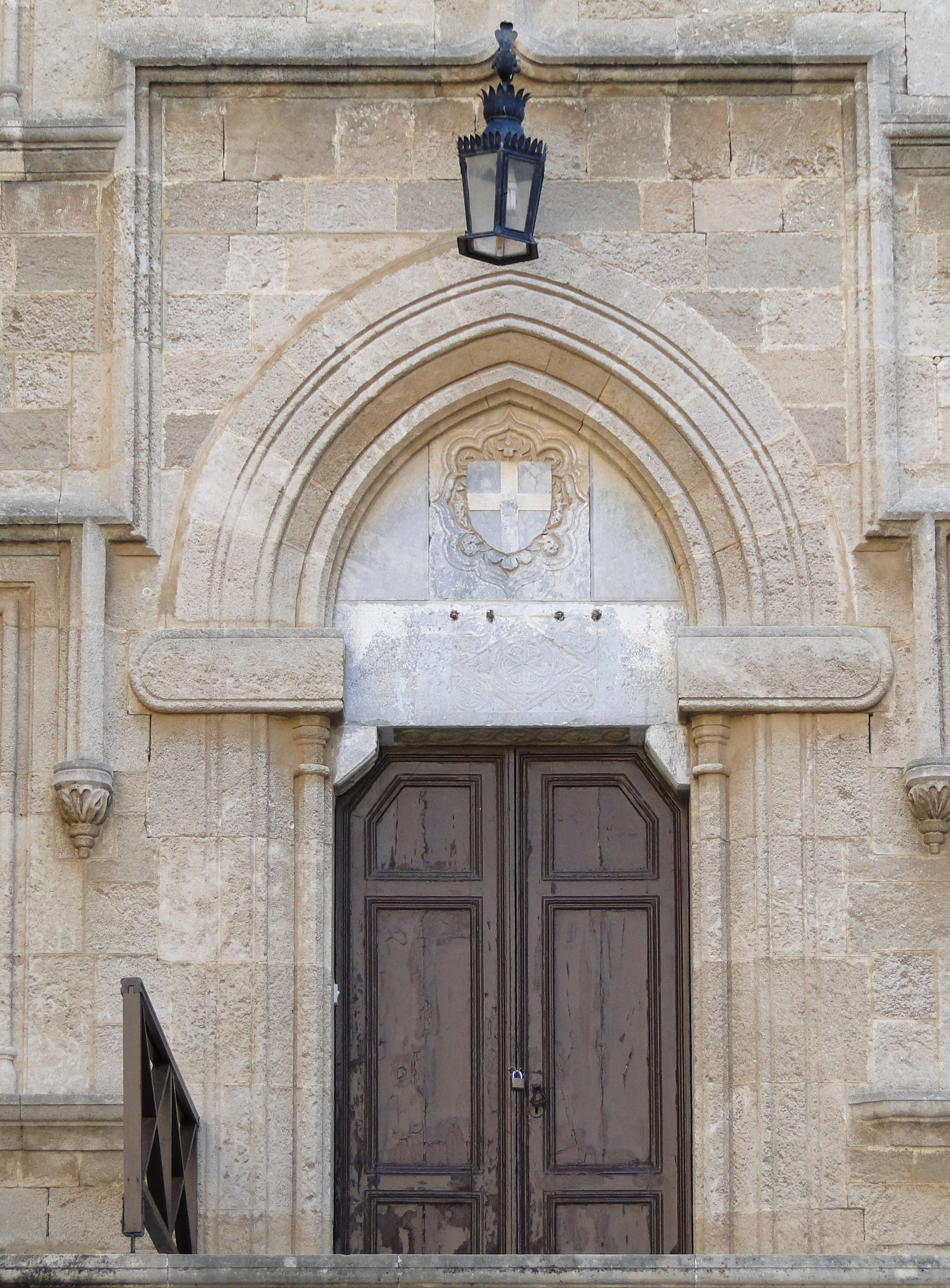
Door

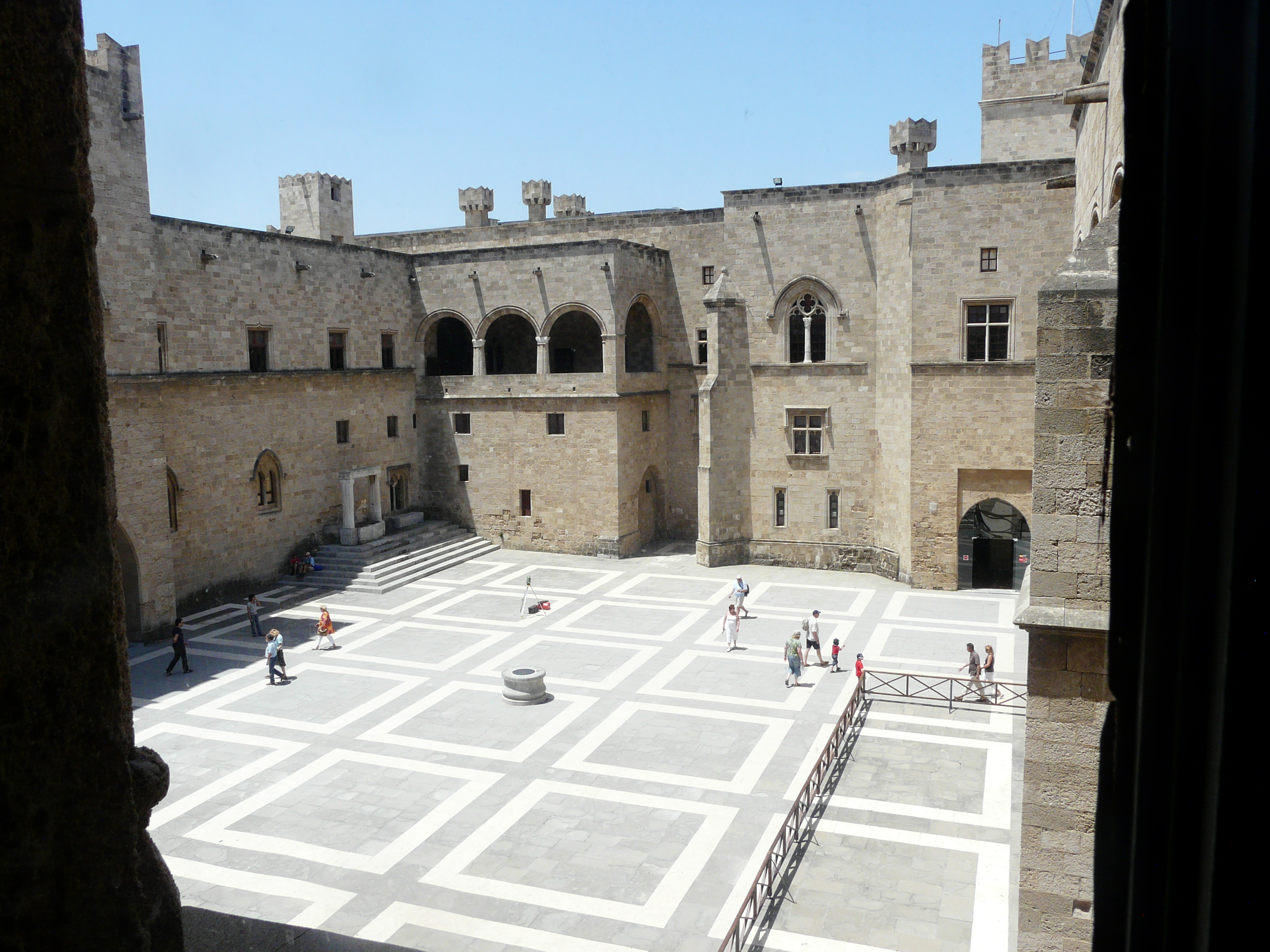
Courtyard

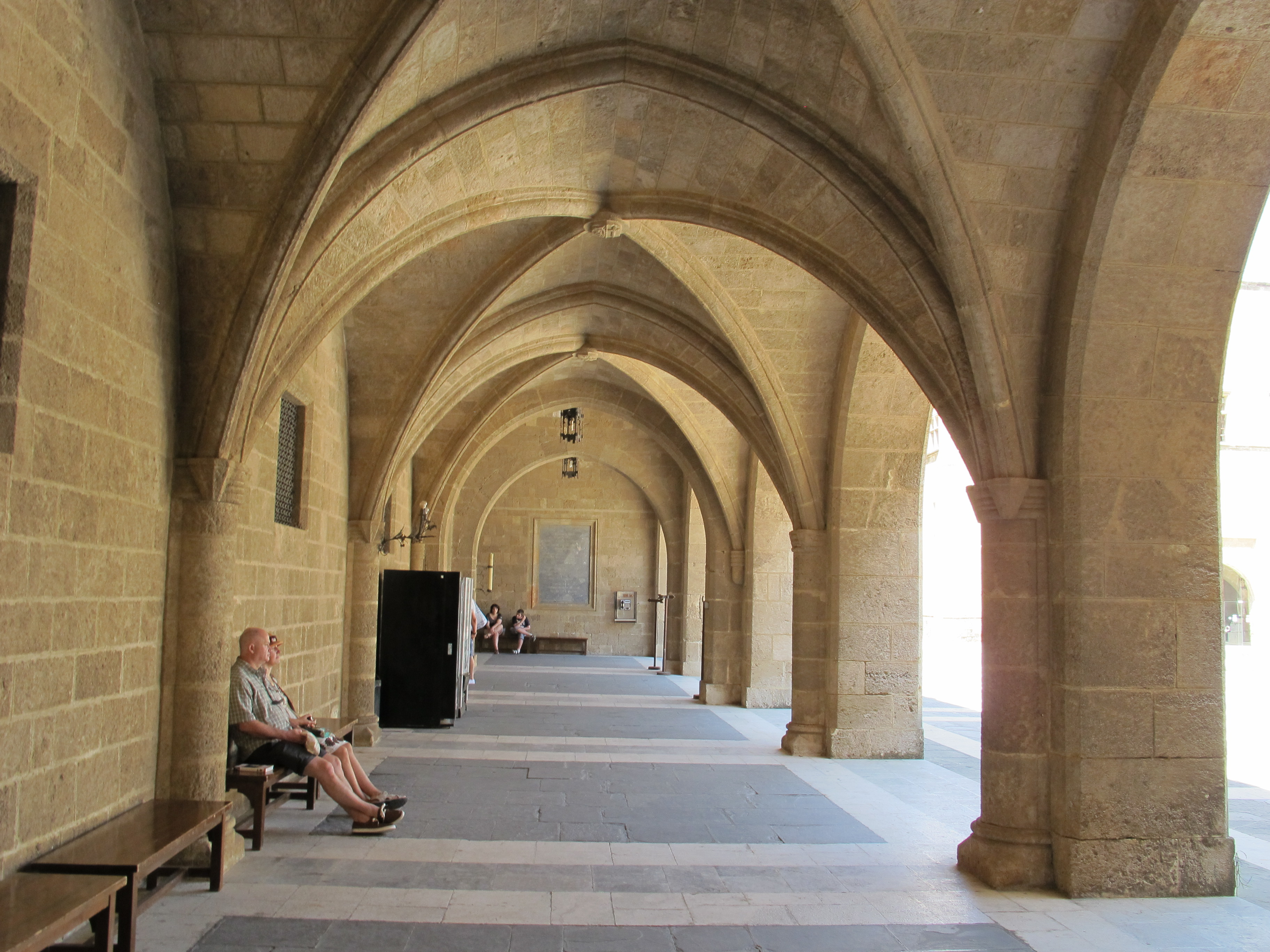
Arcades at the courtyard

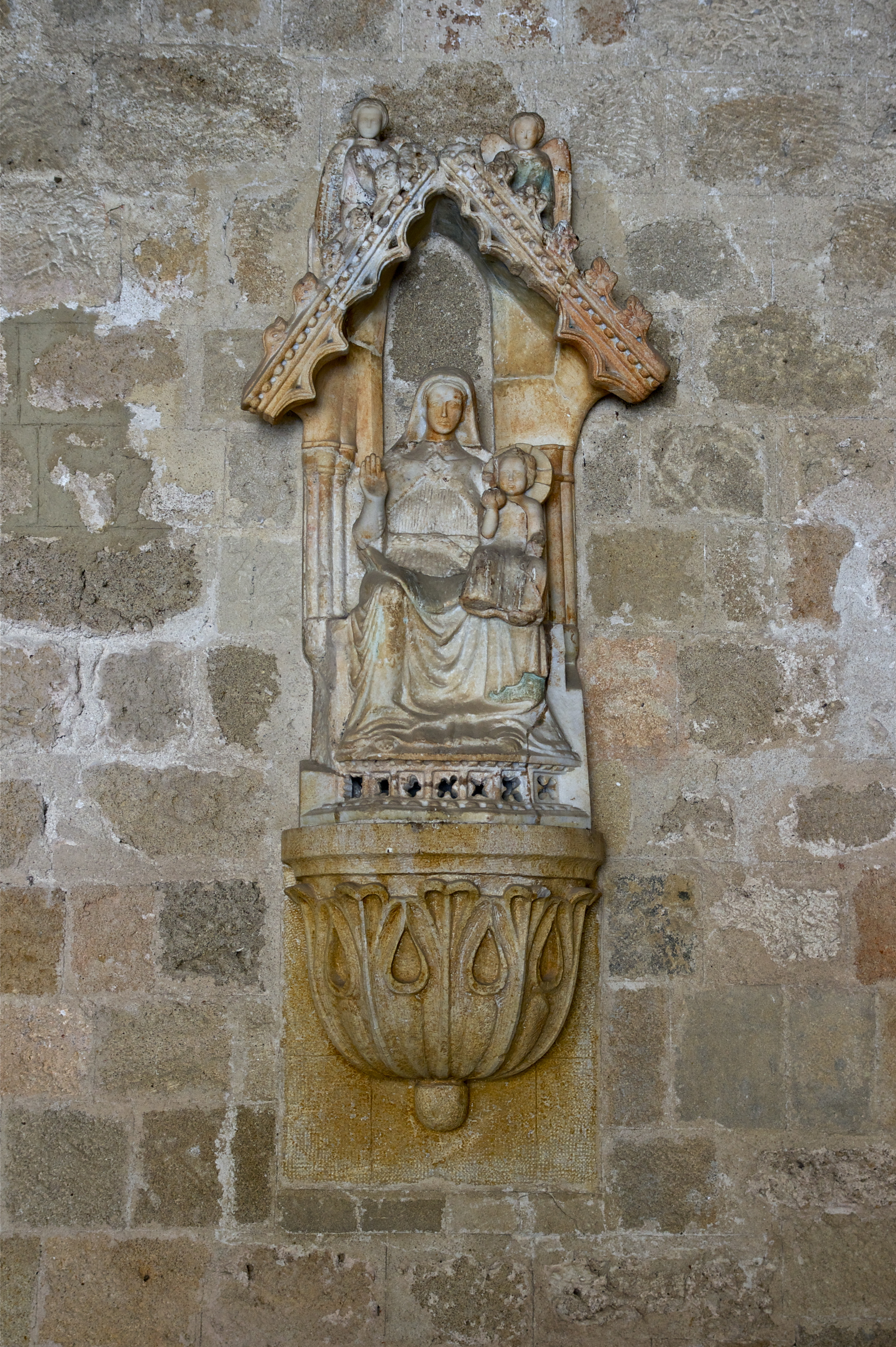
Sculpture of Virgin Mary

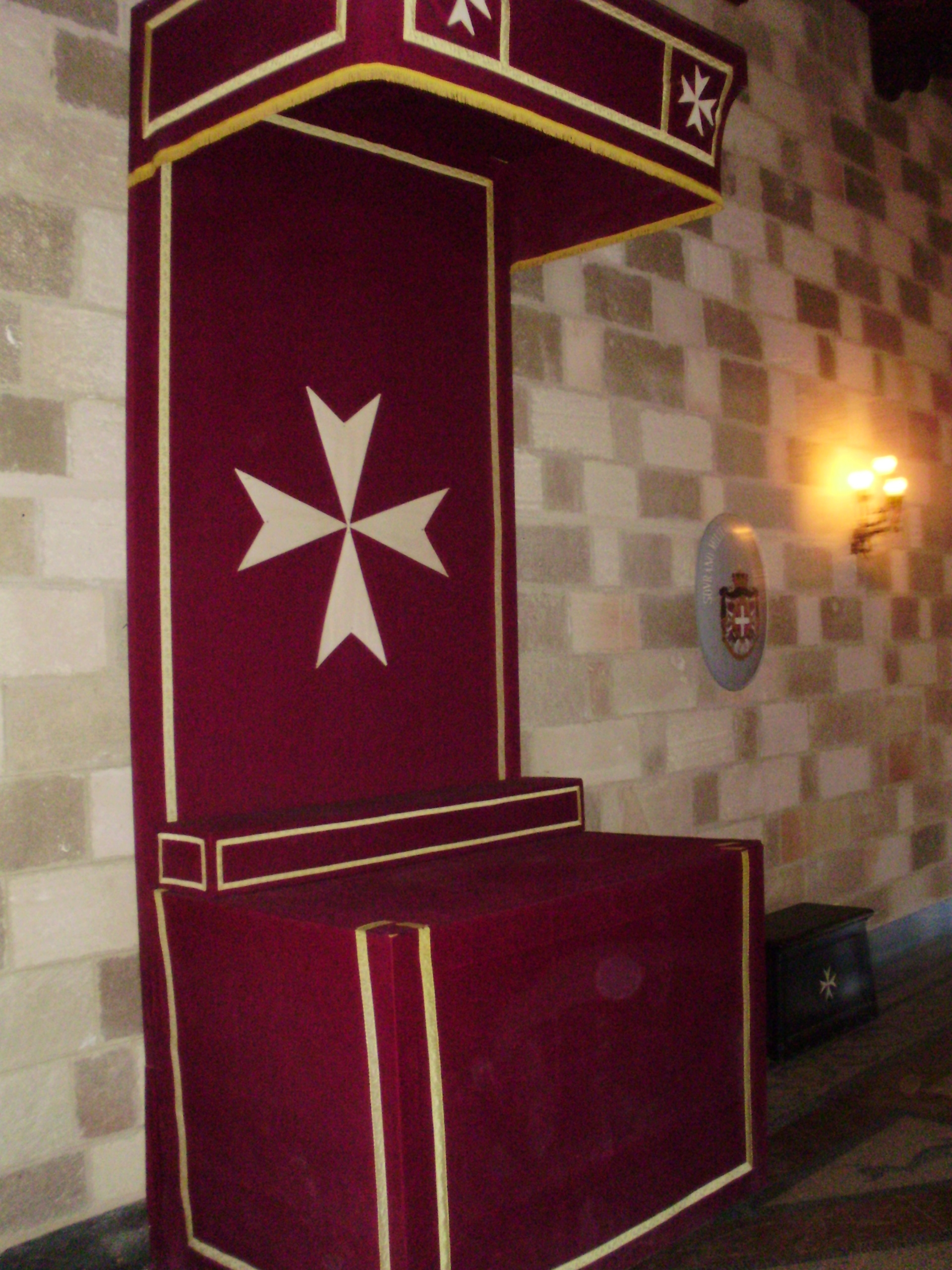
View from the interior

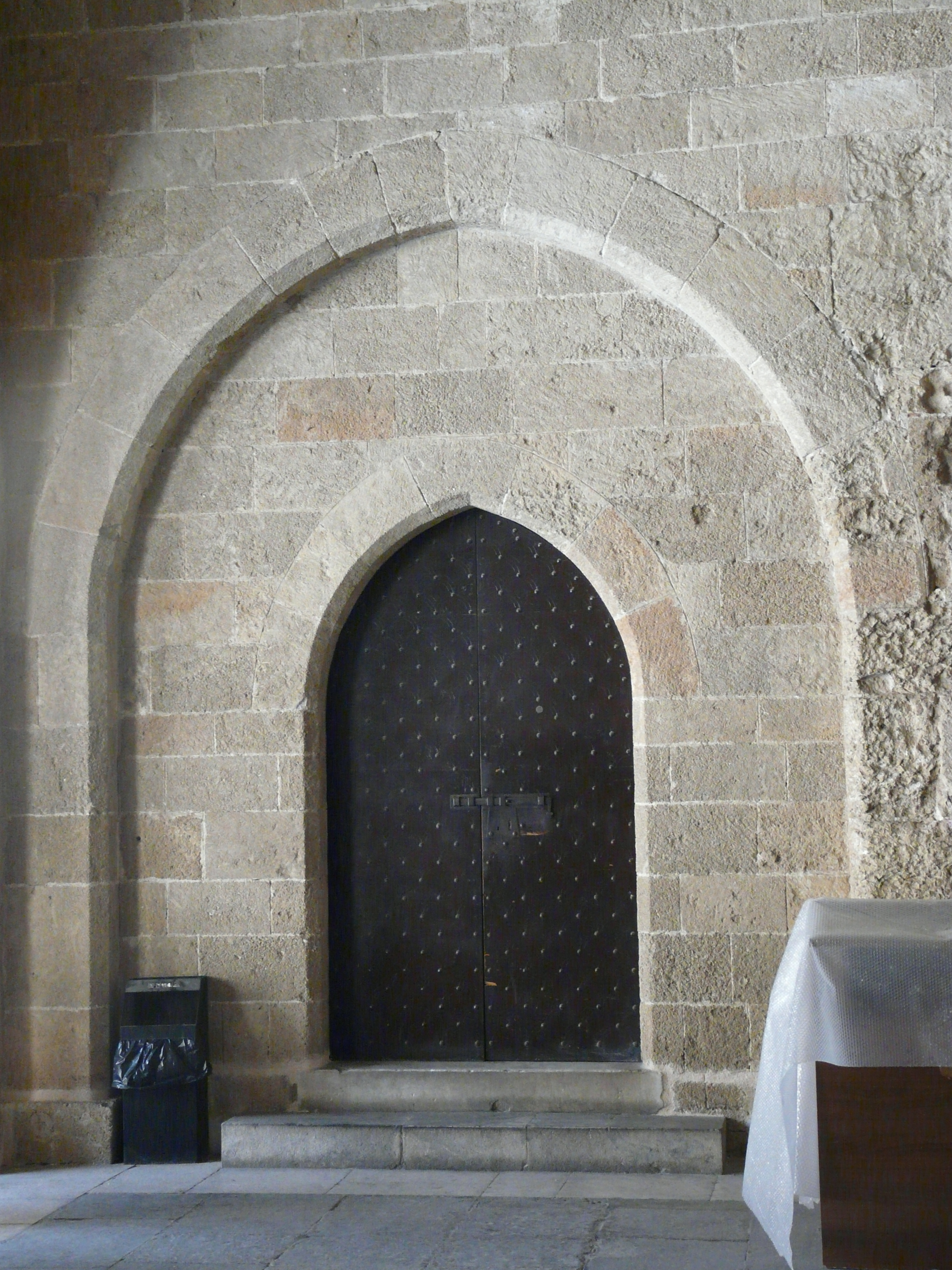
Gothic portal

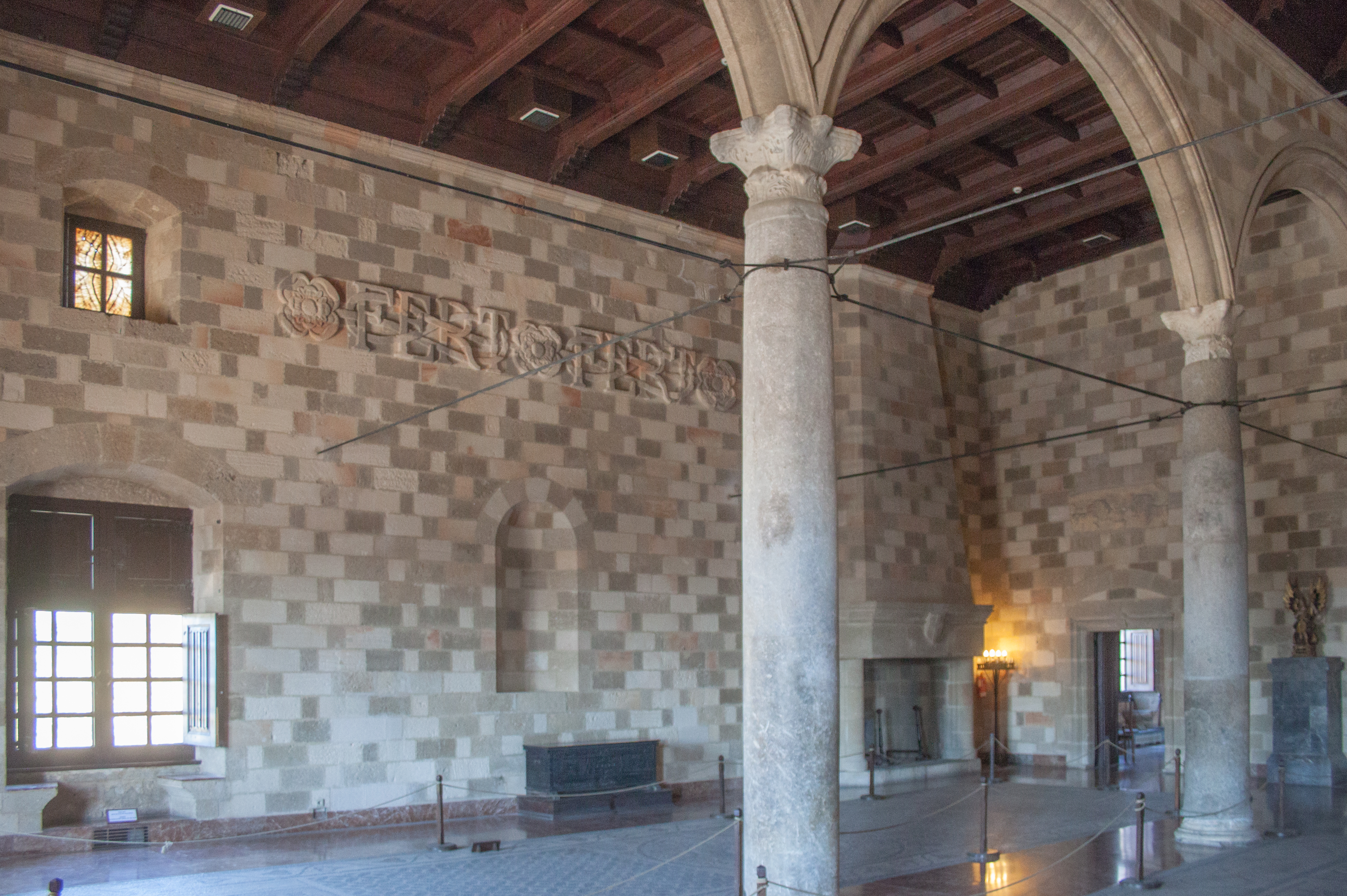
Main hall

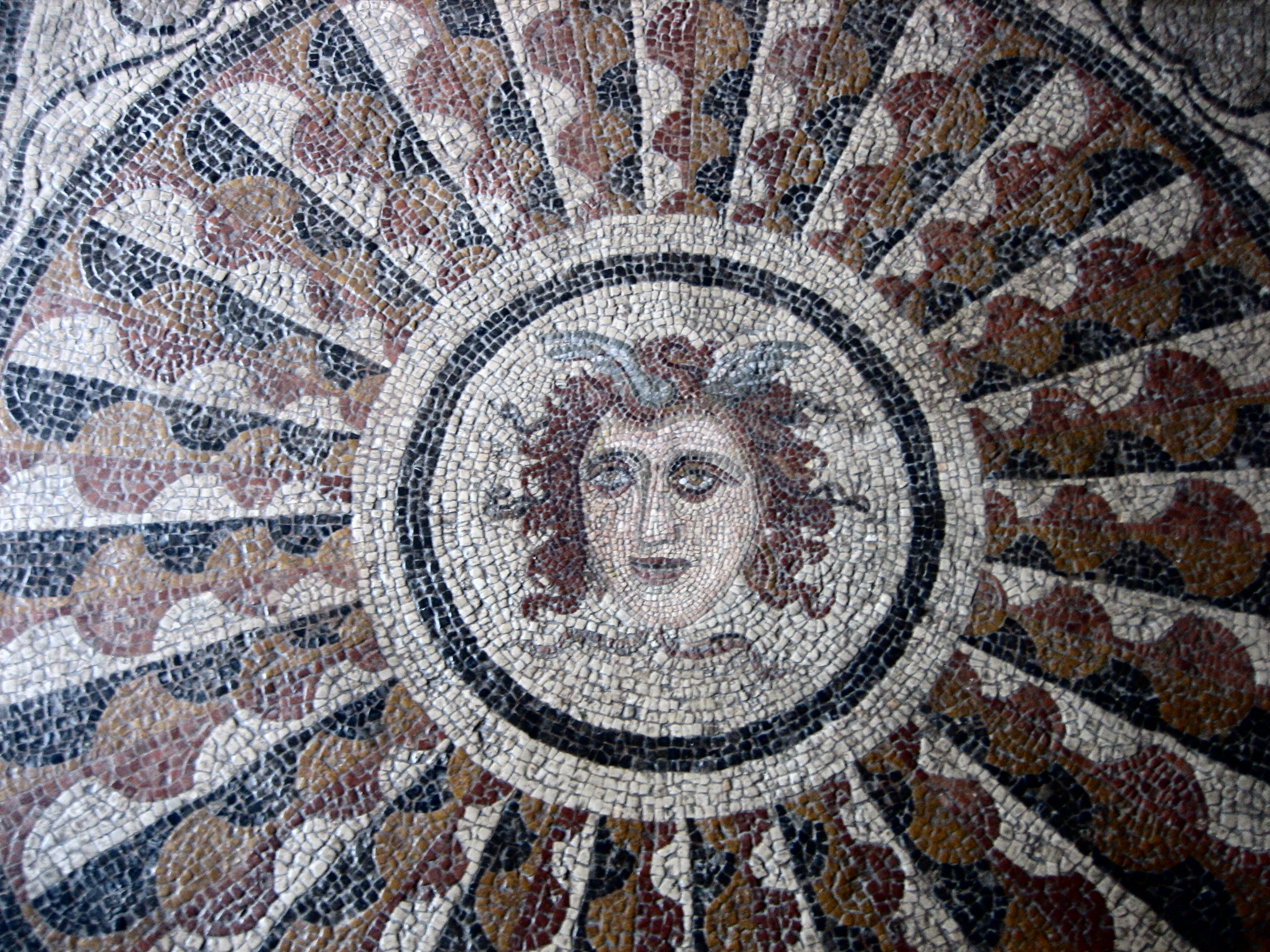
Medusa mosaic (2nd century) from Kos

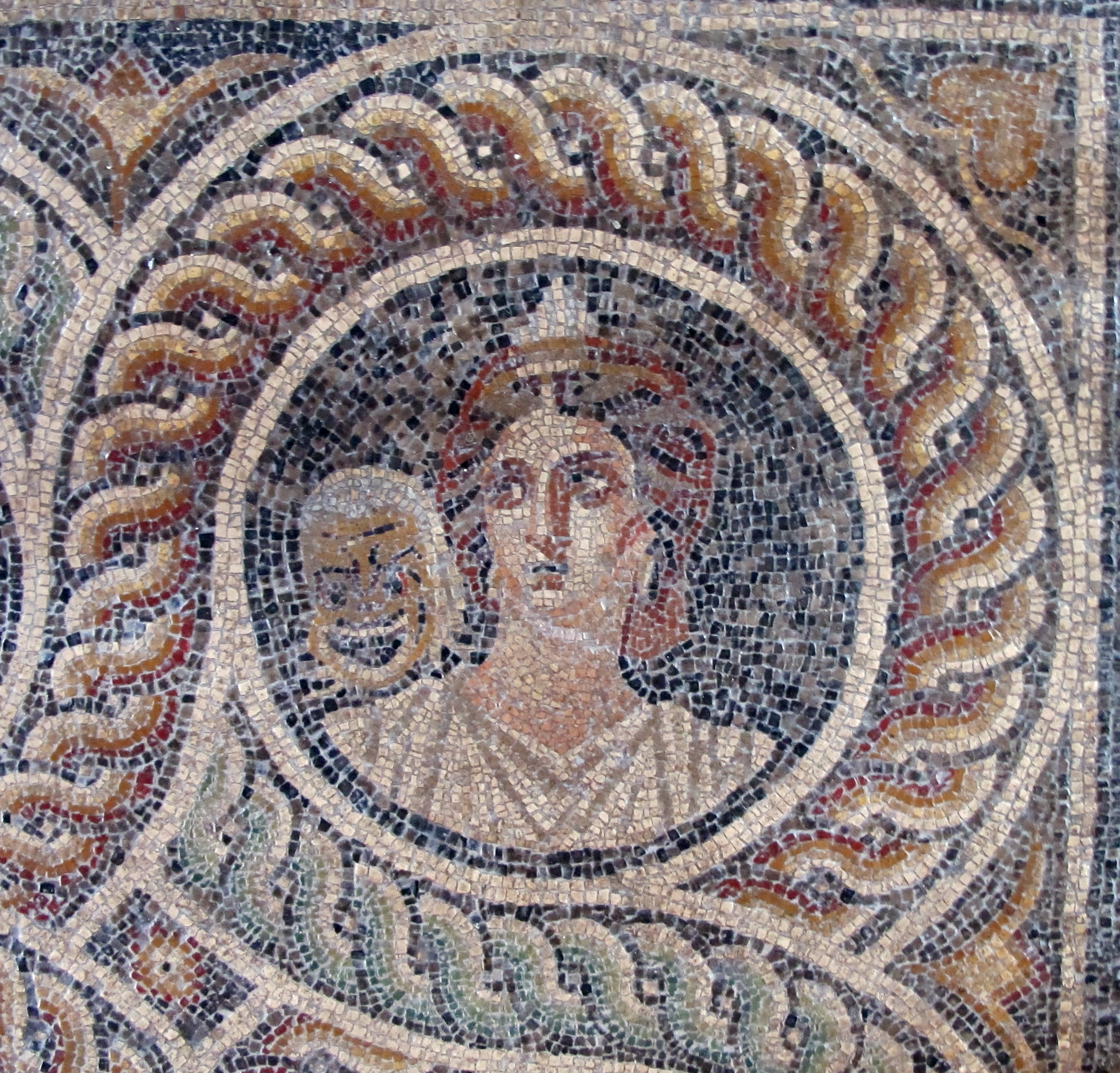
Mosaic with Thalia (Muse) from Kos

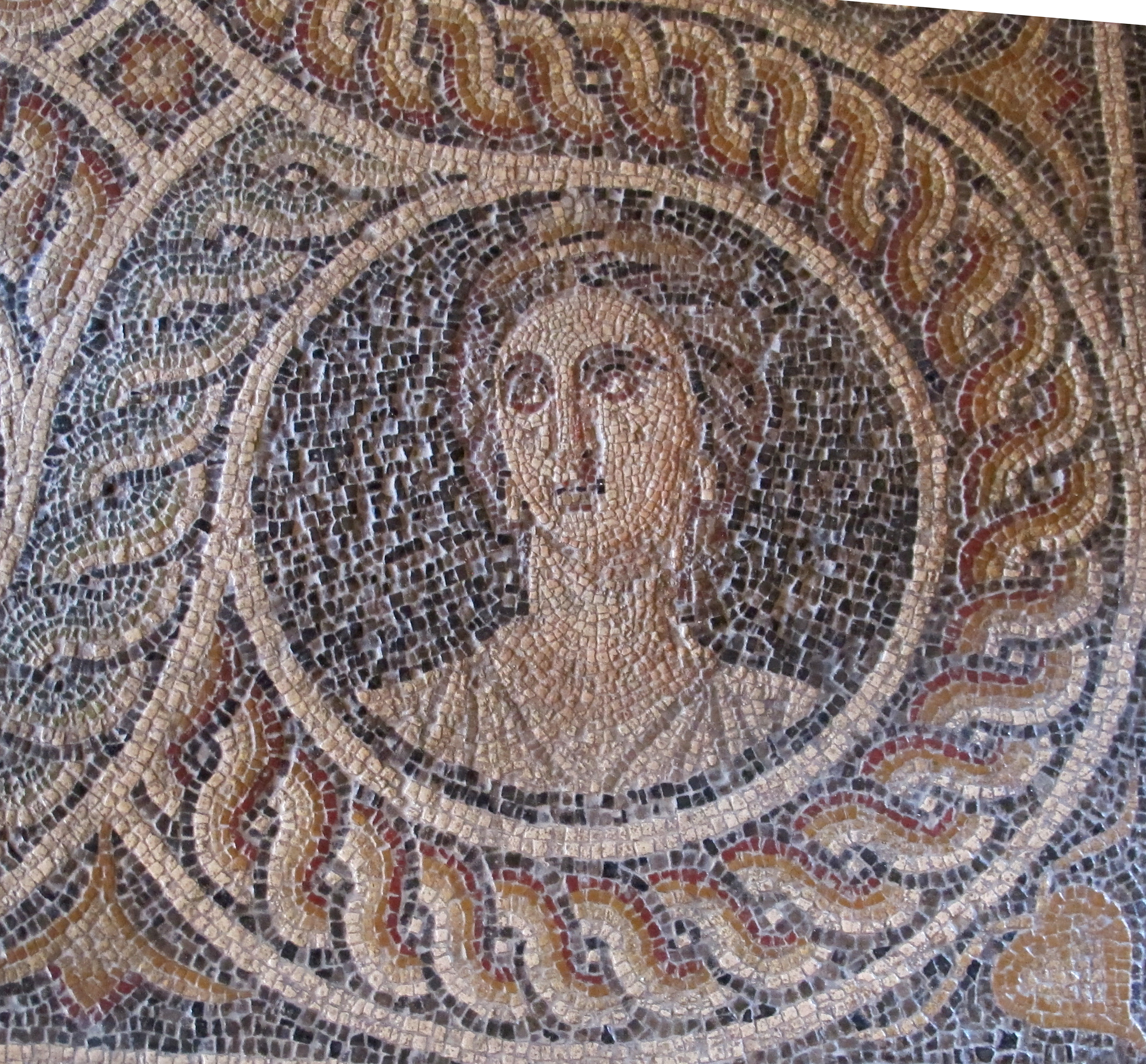
Mosaic with Polyhymnia from Kos

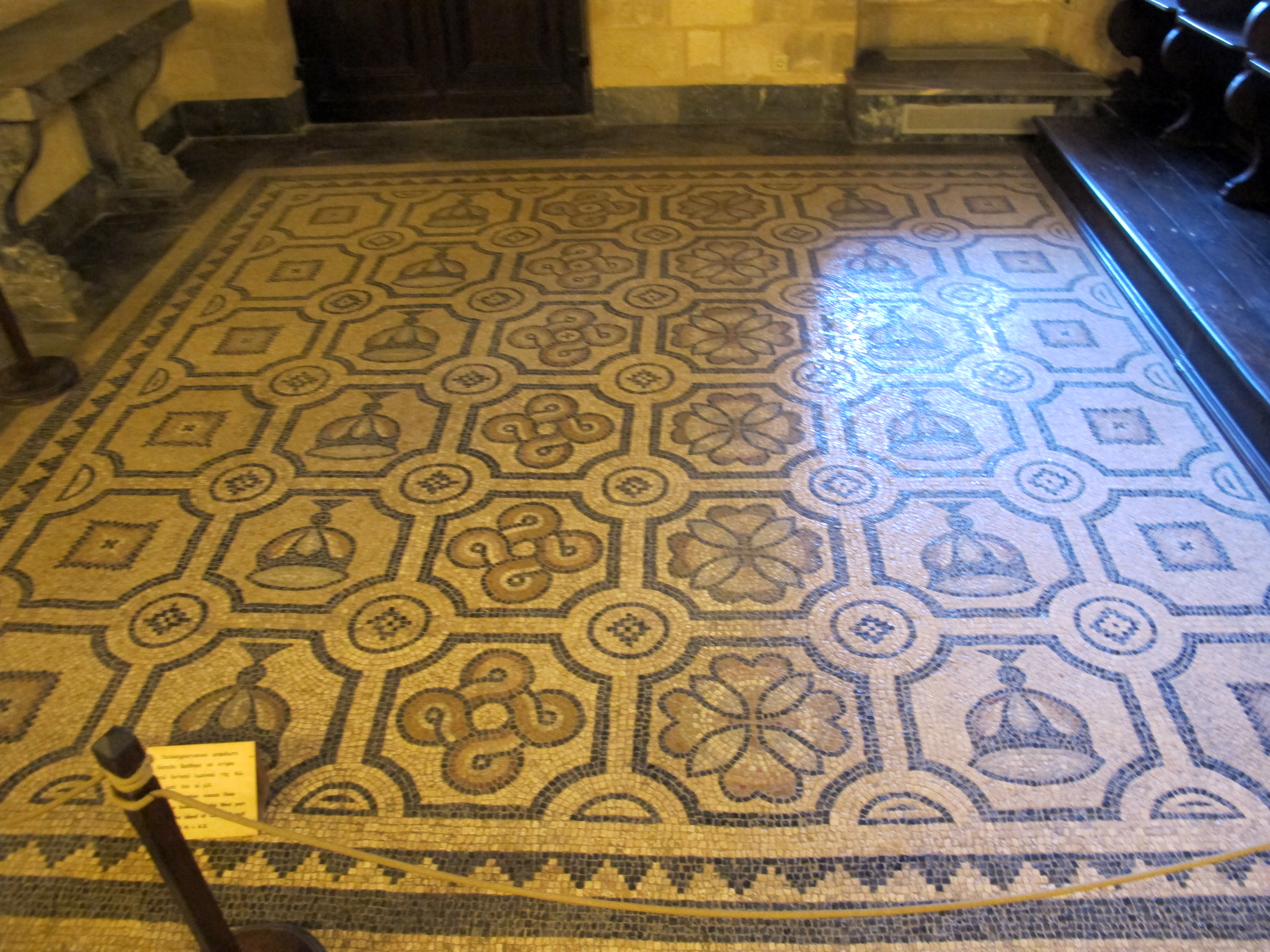
Byzantine mosaic from Kos (450-500)

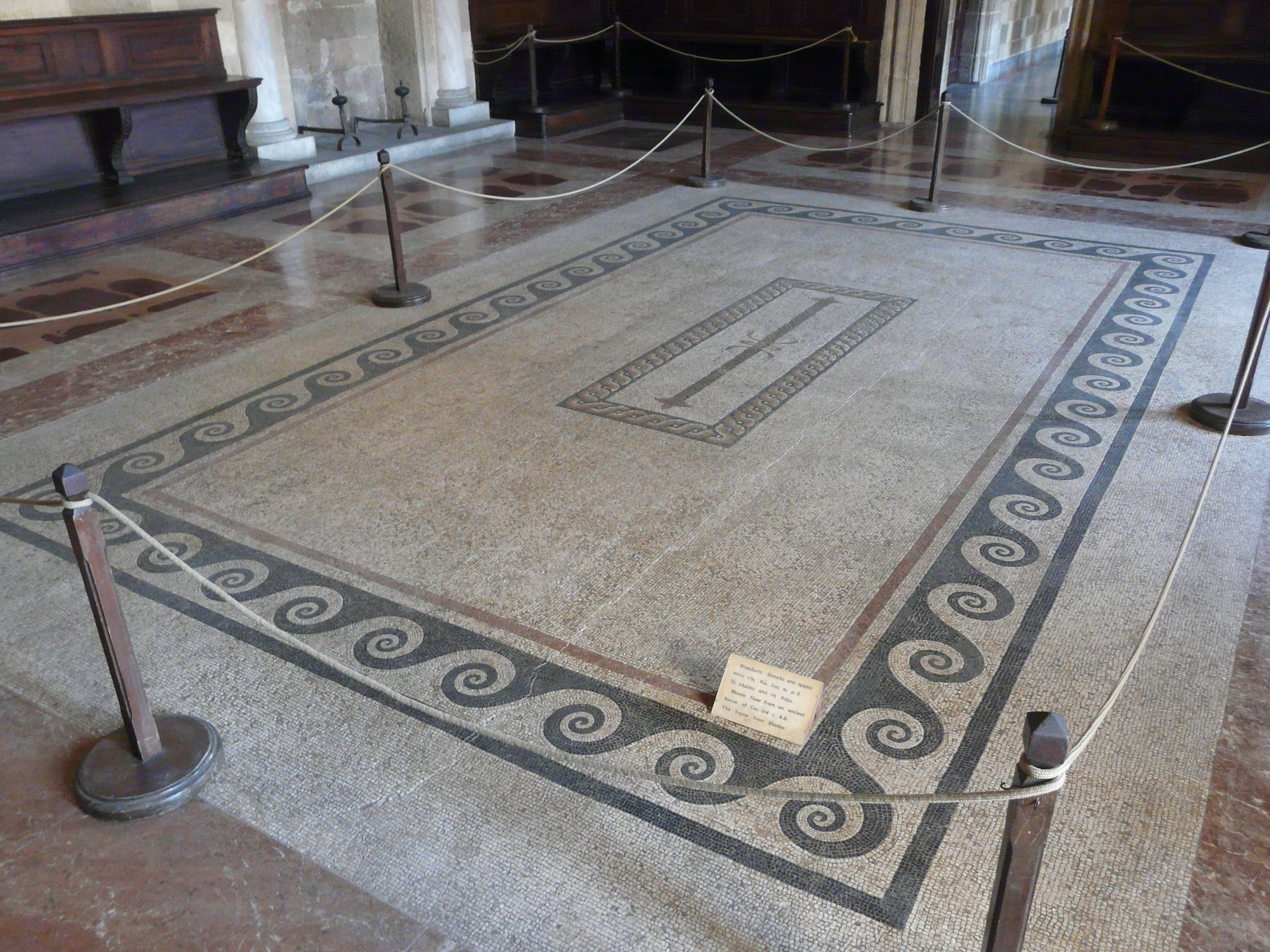
Byzantine mosaic from Kos

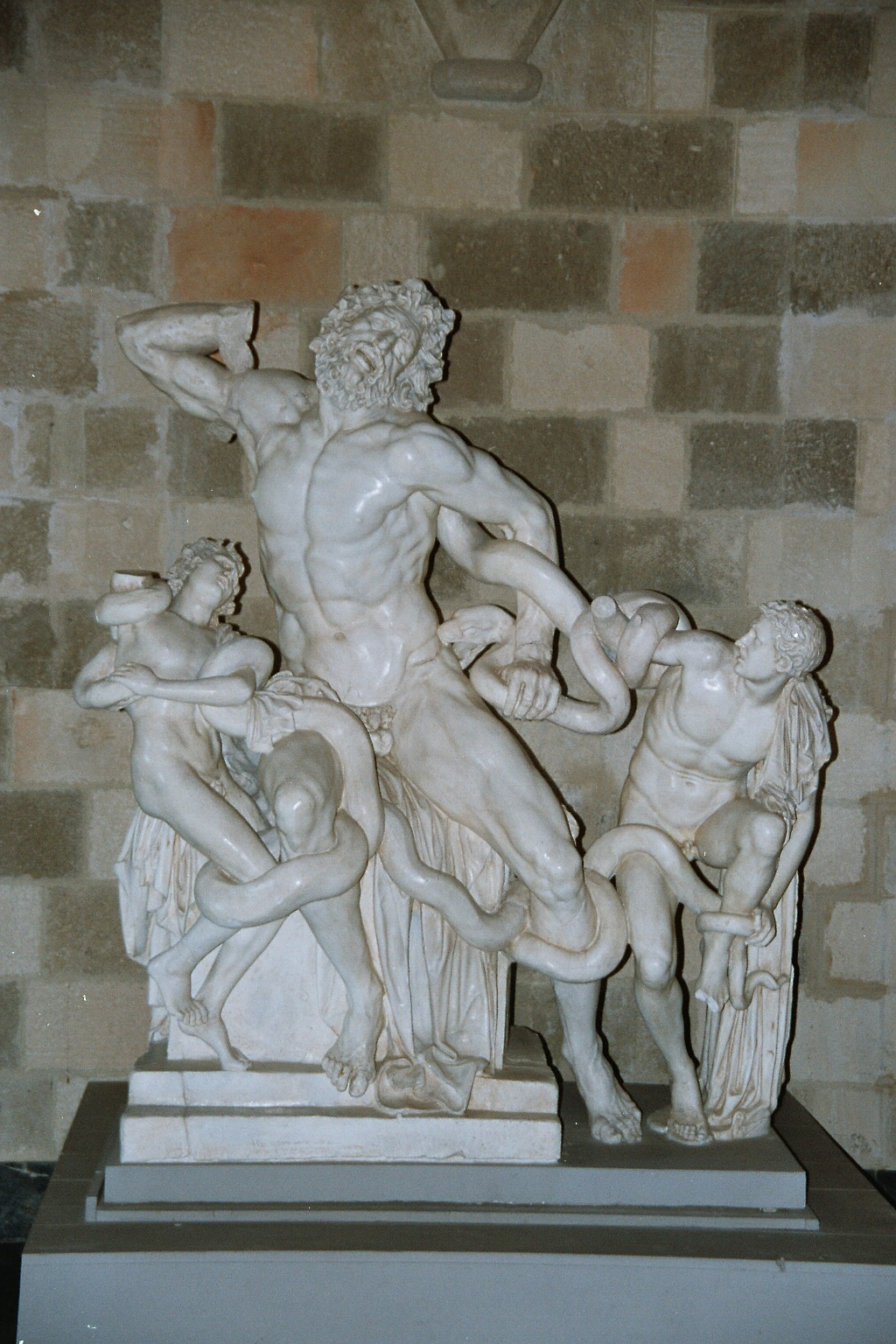
Laocoön and His Sons, modern copy

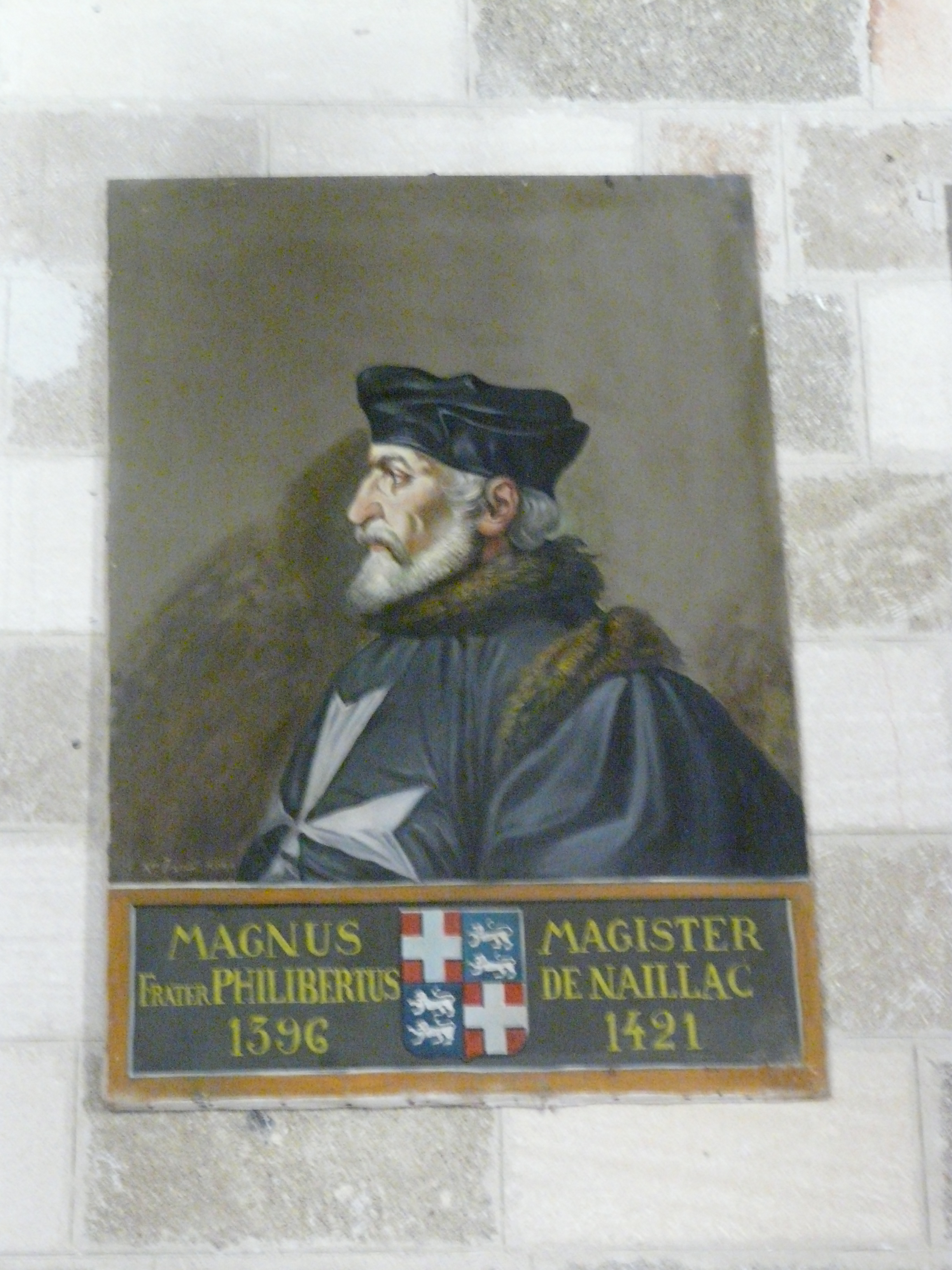
Portrait of Philibert de Naillac, Grand Master (1396-1421)

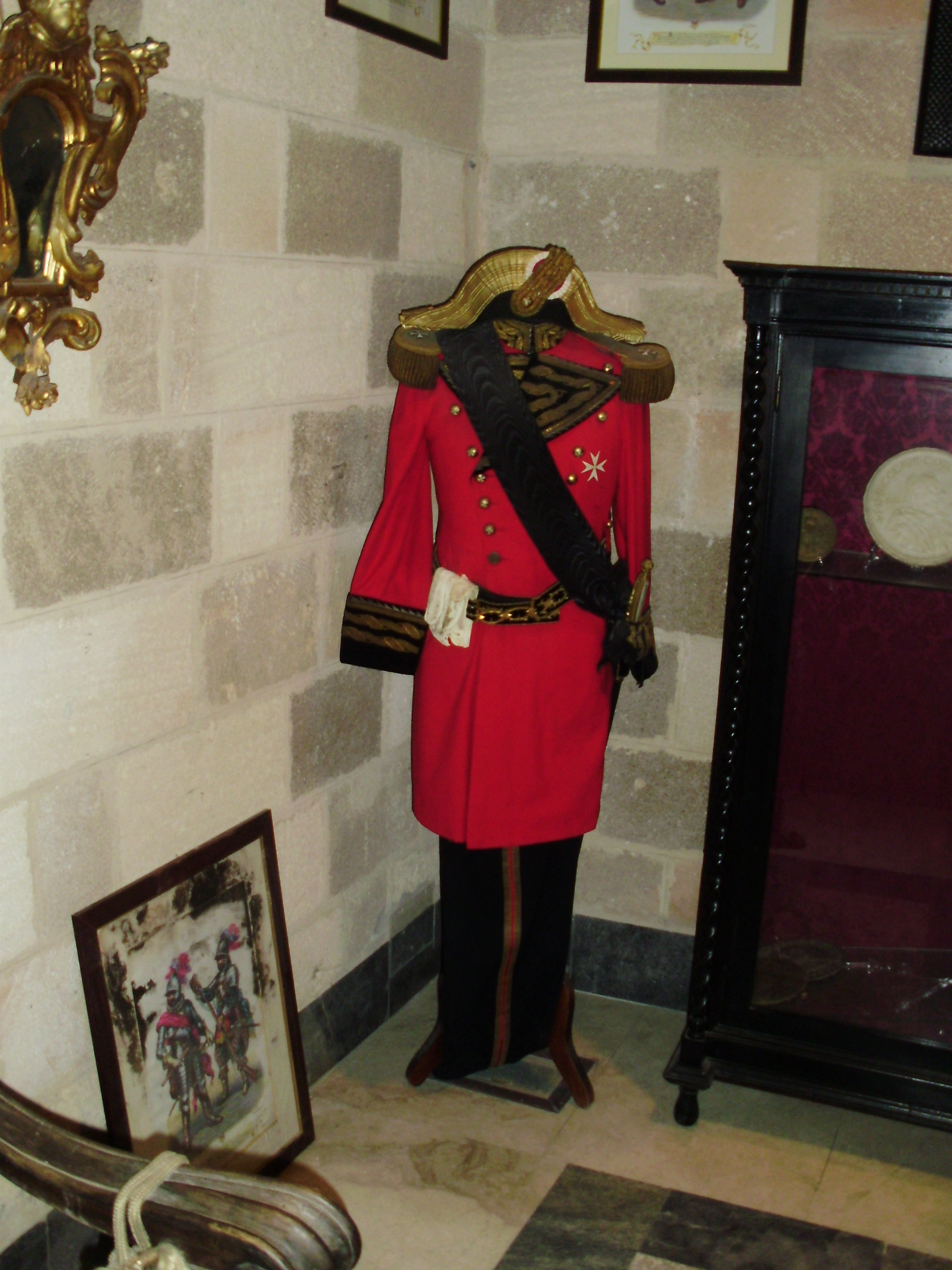
Uniform of the Sovereign Military Order of Malta

== See also ==
- Fortifications of Rhodes
- Knights Hospitaller
- List of Crusader castles
- List of grand masters of the Knights Hospitaller
- Fort St Angelo
- Grandmaster's Palace in Valletta
