= Laocoön (Blake) =

Engraving and poem by William Blake

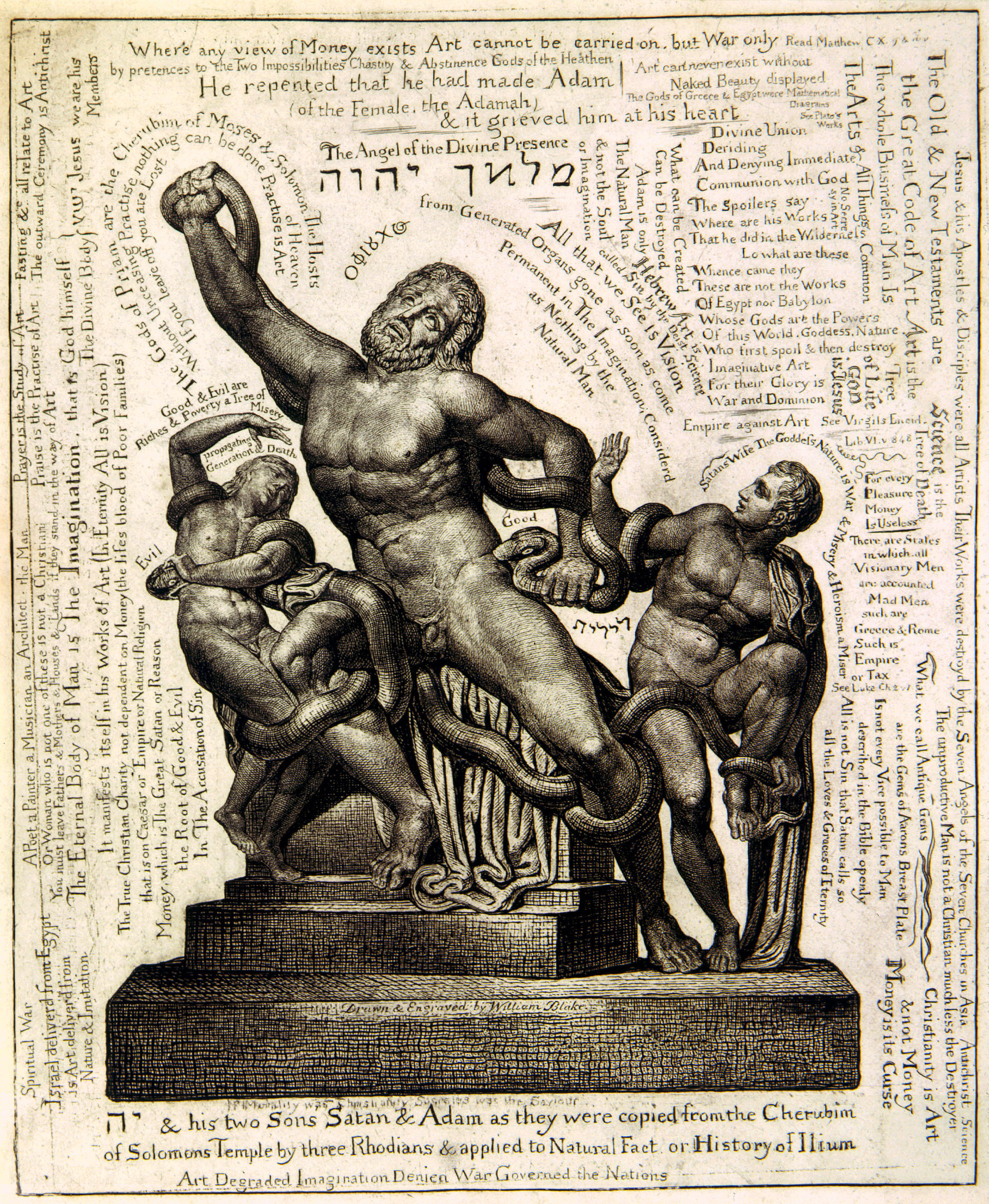
- Laocoön, copy B, object 1
- Artist: William Blake
- Completion date: c. 1815 (illustration); c. 1826–27 (text)
- Medium: Intaglio print

Laocoön is an engraving and poem by English poet and artist William Blake. The central figure of the engraving, an etched illustration of the statue Laocoön and His Sons, was executed around 1815. The text surrounding the statue was added much later; around 1826 to 1827.

== Composition ==
=== Illustration ===
The central illustration is of the ancient statue Laocoön and His Sons, dated to from the 2nd century BCE to the 1st century CE and rediscovered in Rome on 14 January 1506. The sculpture depicts the story of the divine punishment of the Trojan priest Laocoön and his sons by ophidian strangulation, as recounted in Virgil's Aeneid.
