= Pasquino Group =

Group of marble sculptures

Coordinates: 43°46′09″N 11°15′20″E

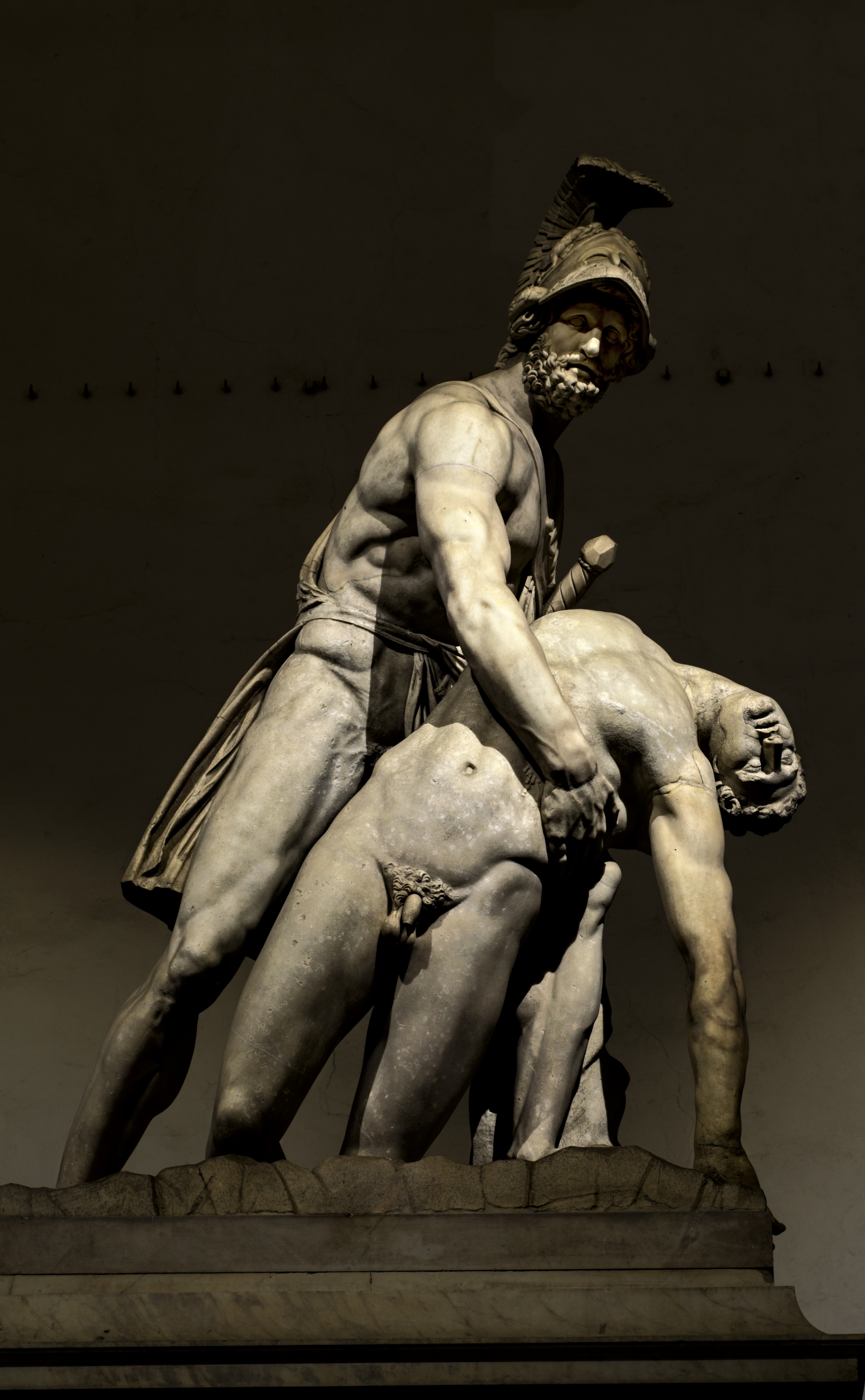
Menelaus supporting the body of Patroclus, in the Loggia dei Lanzi, Florence, Italy

The Pasquino Group (also known as Menelaus Carrying the Body of Patroclus or Ajax Carrying the Body of Achilles) is a group of marble sculptures that copy a Hellenistic bronze original, dating to ca. 200–150 BCE. At least fifteen Roman marble copies of this sculpture are known. Many of these marble copies have complex artistic and social histories that illustrate the degree to which improvisatory "restorations" were made to fragments of ancient Roman sculpture during the 16th and 17th centuries, in which contemporary Italian sculptors made original and often arbitrary and destructive additions in an effort to replace lost fragments of the ancient sculptures.

One of the most famous versions of the composition, though so dismembered and battered that the relationship is scarcely recognizable at first glance, is the so-called Pasquin, one of the talking statues of Rome. It was set up on a pedestal in 1501 and remains unrestored. A version of the group, probably intended to represent other Homeric figures, is part of the Sperlonga sculptures found in 1957.

== Subject ==
Ancient Roman copies of the original Greek sculptural group were first documented in Rome ca. 1500. During the 16th century, various authors proposed different identifications for the dead figure, including Hercules, Geryon, and Alexander the Great. Bernhard Schweitzer's 1936 Das Original der sogennanten Pasquino-Gruppe identifies the subject of the group as Menelaus carrying the body of Patroclus; however, this identification has been questioned and the subject of Ajax carrying the body of Achilles is now widely accepted for most of the Roman copies.

In the case of the very fragmentary group from Sperlonga, most scholars agree it is here intended to show Odysseus carrying the body of the dead Achilles off the battlefield outside Troy (or possibly Ajax doing the carrying), as the other sculptures in the ensemble show scenes from the story of Odysseus. This is an unusual subject, not in Homer, but one that is mentioned by Ovid (Metamorposes, 13, 282 ff) and fits the rest of the programme. Here Odysseus is shown at his most conventionally virtuous, demonstrating pietas.

== The Loggia dei Lanzi group ==
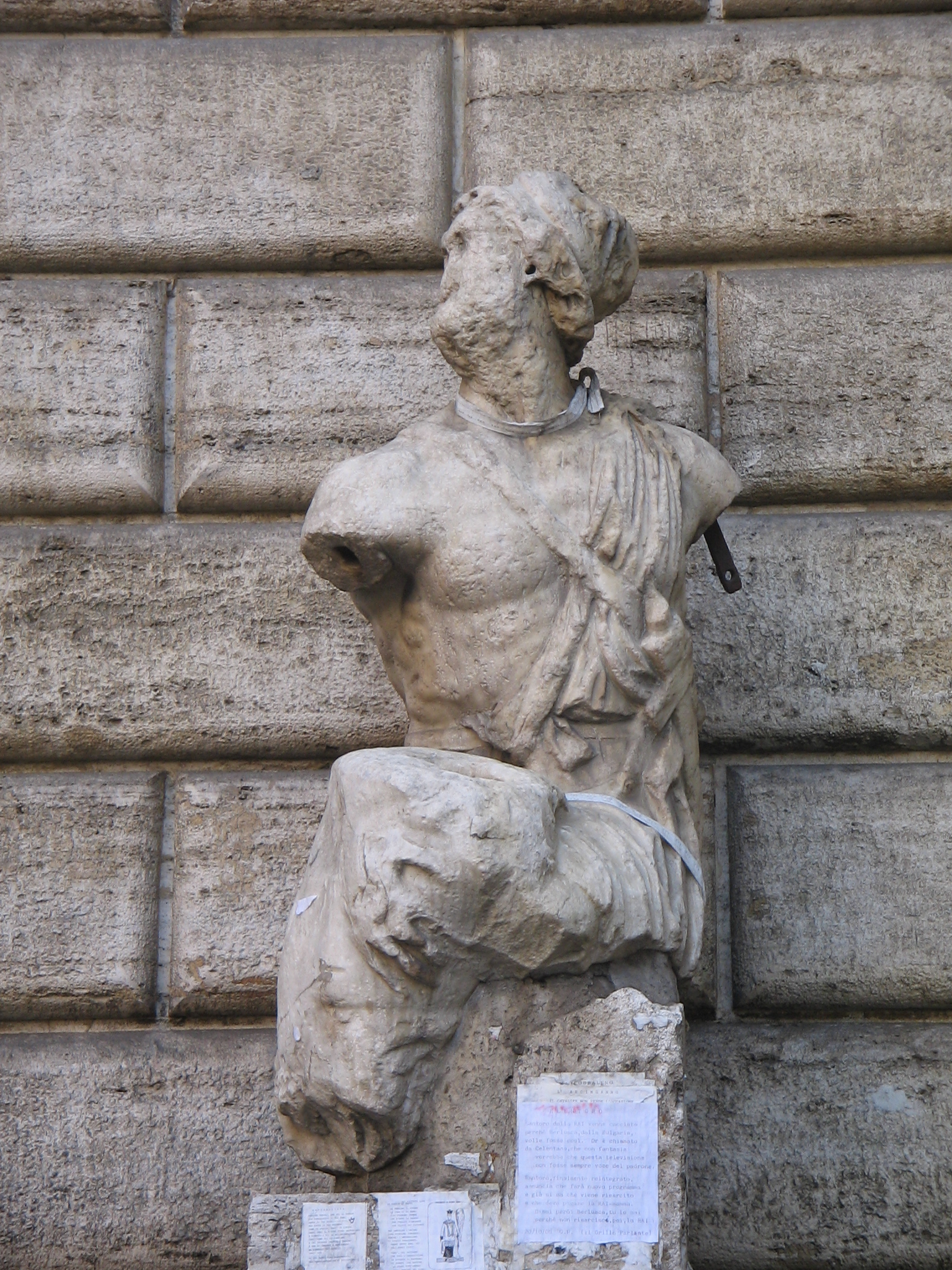
The Pasquino fragment still shows the warrior's eroded hand on the limp torso

Cosimo I, Grand Duke of Tuscany purchased an ancient marble fragment depicting the headless torso of a man in armor supporting a heroically nude dying comrade soon after it was discovered in the vigna of Antonio Velli, half a Roman mile beyond Porta Portese, Rome. With the consent of Pope Pius V, it was taken immediately to Florence, where it appears in the inventory taken at Cosimo's death in 1574. The project for completing the truncated torso of the "Ajax" figure, missing above the waist when it was found according to the Memorie (1594) of the sculptor and antiquarian Flaminio Vacca, was commissioned by Ferdinando II; the "restoration" was worked out by Pietro Tacca and executed by Lodovico Salvetti from Tacca's model, according to Filippo Baldinucci. It was set up in a niche on the south end of the Ponte Vecchio. Paolo Alessandro Maffei's engraving of 1704 shows that the "Ajax" figure then was wearing a helmet much simpler than the elaborate neoclassical one erroneously provided by Ricci seen on the sculpture today.

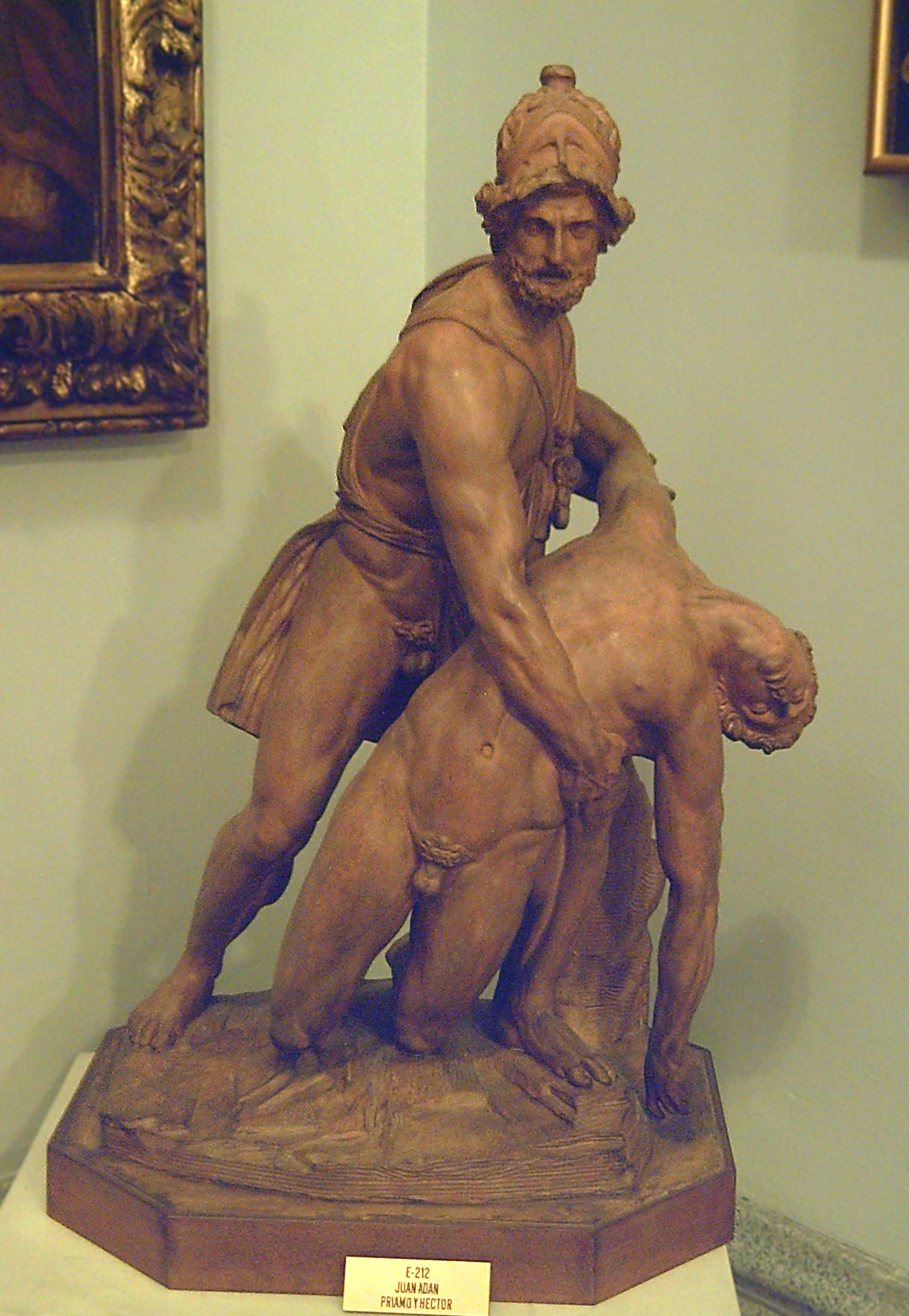
Terracotta reduction by Juan Adán Morlán, as Priam supporting the body of Hector (Royal Academy of Fine Arts of San Fernando, Madrid)

In 1771, the neoclassic artist Anton Raphael Mengs took moulds of the parts he considered genuinely ancient (and thus original) of this sculpture and the version at the Palazzo Pitti (discussed below) and reassembled them in a plaster model that was intended to be more faithful to the Roman original. It was taken away to be further repaired in 1798 and remained in obscurity, undergoing further adjustments by Stefano Ricci in the 1830s, until it was finally re-erected in 1838, in the Loggia dei Lanzi in the Piazza della Signoria, Florence. The feature which still draws most attention is the lifeless hanging left arm of the "Achilles" figure, seemingly dislocated, which was in fact part of the Tacca-Salvetti restoration. Other errors in restoration are the lifted left leg of the bearer, the raised right knee of Patroclus, and the mounded ground that serves as a base.

== The second Medici group ==
The second version was a gift in 1570 from the Florentine Paolo Antonio Soderini of Rome. It was said to have been found at the Mausoleum of Augustus. Identified as Ajax, it stands in the Cortile del Ajaco of Palazzo Pitti.

Further fragments of other Roman copies of this group have appeared during the 20th century, but more severe and careful modern criteria for restoration have led historians to avoid trying to restore them as a completed figural group, as past individuals attempted to do with the Pasquino group.

== The Hadrian group ==
Five fragments of a Pasquino group were excavated from Hadrian's Villa by Gavin Hamilton in 1769. This sculpture was a part of the Roman emperor Hadrian's collection of copies of Greek masterpieces. Unlike other copies, the deceased figure in Hadrian's copy is wounded on the back. This has been interpreted as evidence that Hadrian's copy was meant to represent Menelaus and Patroclus, since the Iliad states that he was killed by a blow to the back. These fragments are in the Vatican Museums. The head of Menelaus is on display in the museum's Hall of Busts.
