= Sperlonga sculptures =

Ancient Roman sculptures, rediscovered 1957

Coordinates: 41.2526°N 13.4492°E

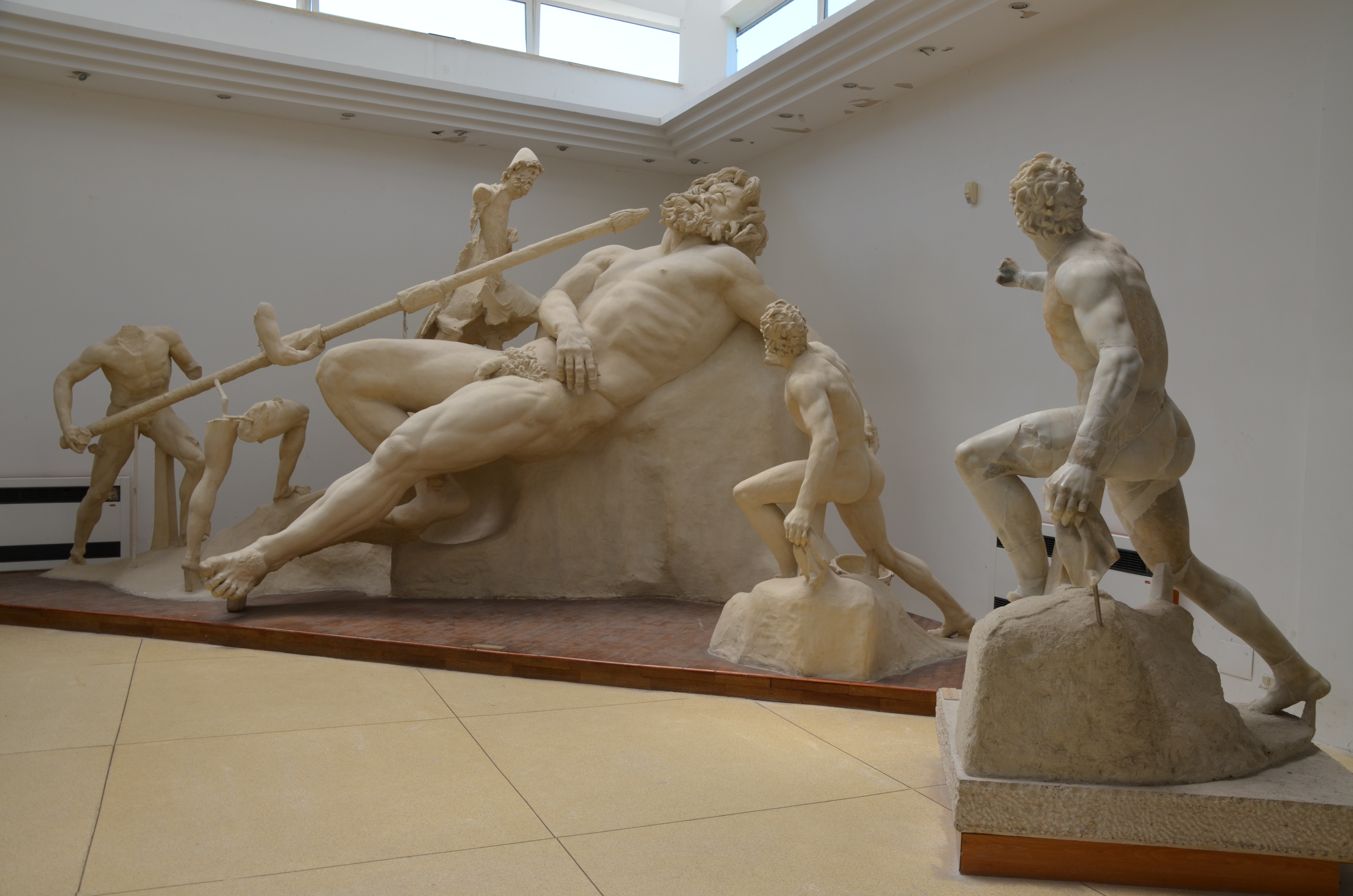
The central group at Sperlonga, with the Blinding of Polyphemus; cast reconstruction of the group, with at the right the original figure of the "wineskin-bearer" seen in front of the cast version.

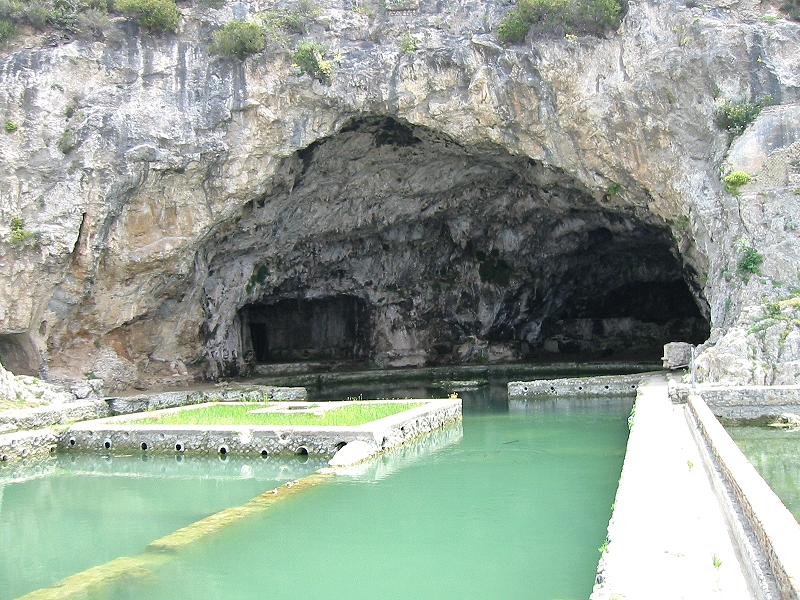
The grotto and pool today, the triclinium with grass. The "Scylla" island can be seen in the grotto.

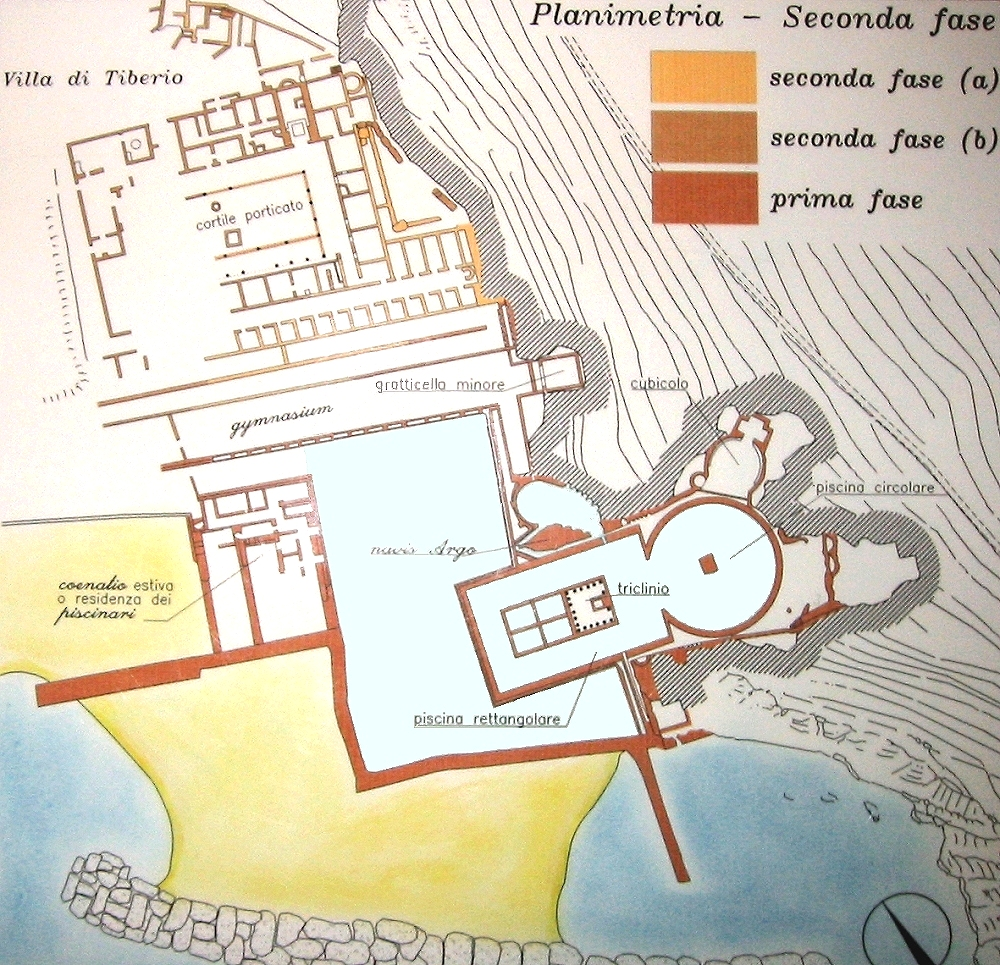
Plan of the villa and grotto

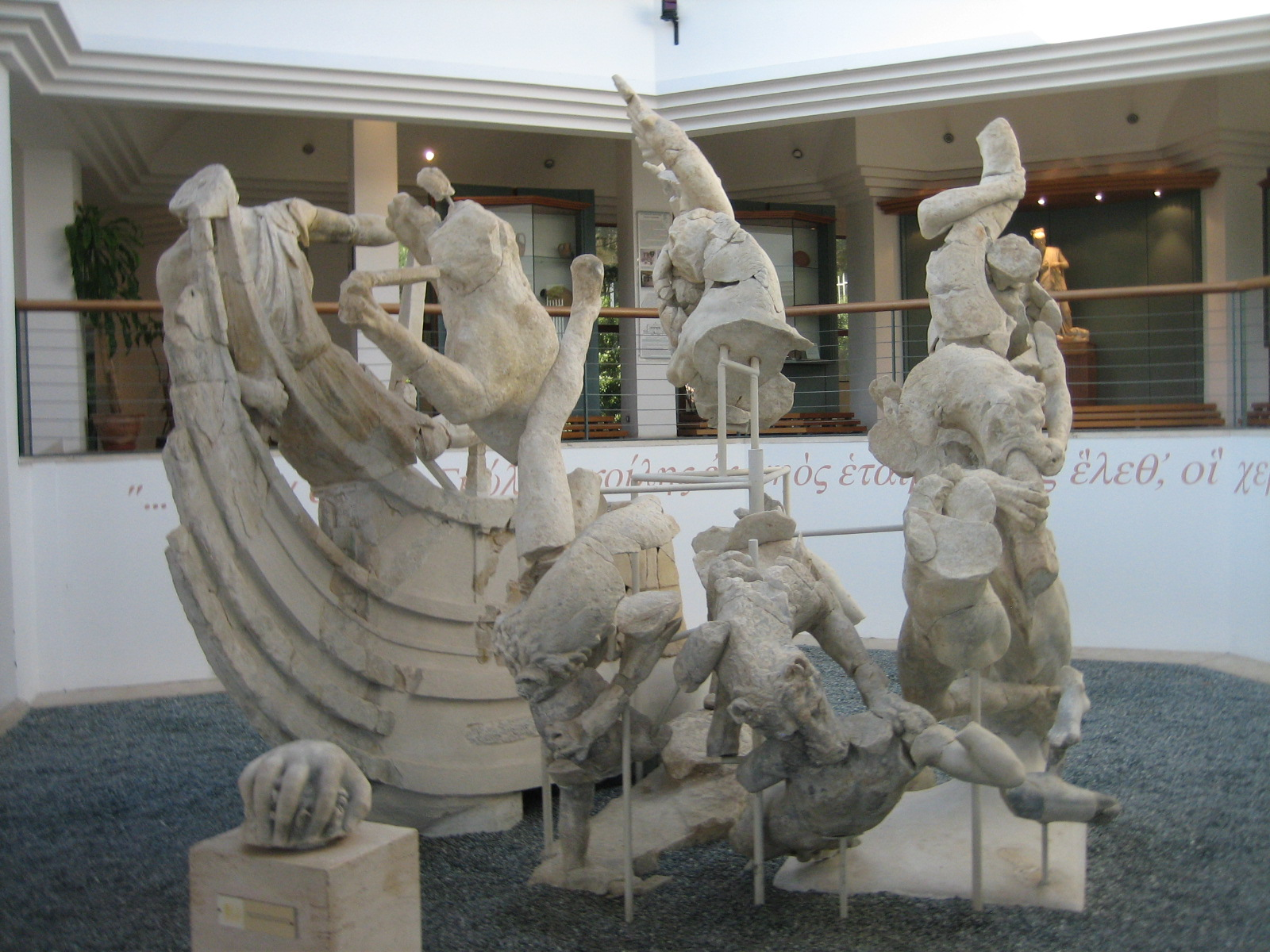
The "Scylla group" (cast reconstruction)

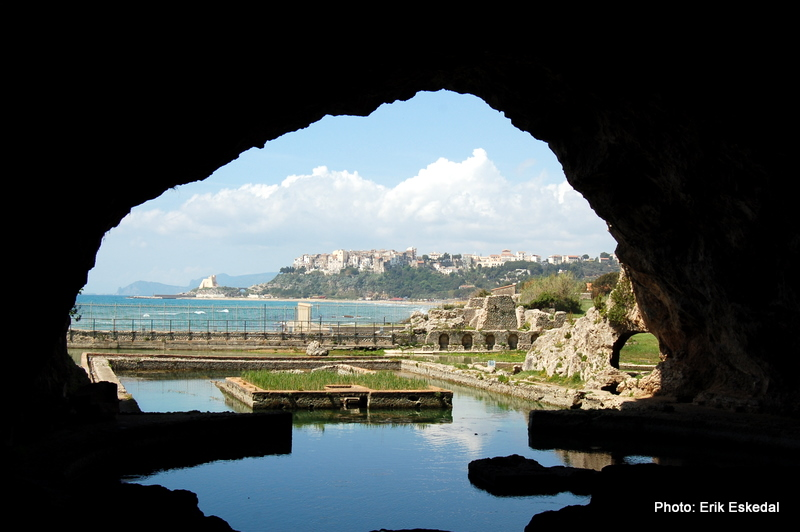
Looking out from the grotto

The Sperlonga sculptures are a large and elaborate ensemble of ancient sculptures discovered in 1957 in the grounds of the former villa of the Emperor Tiberius at Sperlonga, on the coast between Rome and Naples, Italy. As reconstructed, the sculptures were arranged in groups around the interior of a large natural grotto facing the sea used by Tiberius for dining; many scholars believe he had the sculptures installed. The groups portray incidents from the story of the Homeric hero Odysseus in an evocative, Hellenistic style, "a loud, full-blown baroque", but are generally thought to date to the early Imperial period.

As Tacitus and Suetonius recount, the grotto collapsed in 26 AD, nearly killing Tiberius, and either then or in a later fall the sculptures were crushed into thousands of fragments, so that the modern reconstructions have many missing elements. A museum was established in 1963 at Sperlonga to display the reconstructed sculptures and other finds from the villa, with cast reconstructions of the large groups, which are described by the classicist Mary Beard as "creative reinventions". As in the first picture here, many elements can be seen twice, as pieced-together originals, and as reconstructions using plaster casts of original pieces, filled out with educated guesswork.

As usually reconstructed, the sculptures were arranged in four main groups around an artificial circular pool occupying most of the grotto, and connecting to a larger pool outside, one on an island in the centre of the circle. At the rear of the cave and to the right was a group showing the Blinding of Polyphemus the cyclops (one-eyed giant) by Odysseus and his men, dominated by the huge figure of Polyphemus lying drunk. Forward of this, on an island in the middle of the pool, was a group showing Odysseus' ship attacked by the monster Scylla. Two smaller groups placed on the sides of the pool's opening to the main pool outside are usually interpreted as, to the left, a "Pasquino group" of Odysseus carrying the body of Achilles from the battlefield, and to the right, Odysseus about to betray Diomedes after they steal the Trojan cult image of the Palladium from Troy in the course of its siege by the Greeks.

On a niche in the cliff face above the entrance to the grotto was Ganymede carried up by the Eagle, a disguise of Zeus, apparently from the same period as the Odysseus groups. Some other statues around the grotto appear to belong both to earlier and later periods, and are excluded from the general comments here. The sculptures were designed to be seen from a triclinium or dining space with couches, presumably inside at least a tent or a "light pavilion", set on a rectangular island in the fish pond running into the grotto, and presumably also by walking round the grotto itself, and possibly bathing in the pool. They would presumably have been artificially lit, especially at night, as the rear of the grotto would have been rather dim even in daylight. The grotto was also decorated with "artificial stalactites and encrustations" as well as a coloured opus sectile floor, and a "room" left of the Polyphemus group had a number of theatrical masks mounted on the walls, designed to be lit from behind.

== The groups ==
The execution of the sculptures varies considerably in quality, and must have required a large team as well as the three masters named in the inscription (see below). But the variation is within as well as between the groups and figures, and scholars accept that the whole ensemble was made as a single project. They are marked by an exceptionally extensive use of plain marble struts between sculpted elements, left to strengthen the figures; even the toes of Polyphemus are connected by them. This has been used to argue for off-site production, perhaps in Rhodes, with the struts needed for protection during transport. Many elements are only finished to be viewed from particular angles, with their "back" left roughly worked.

The initial discovery of the sculptures in 1957 was by civil engineers building the coastal road just above the site, and there was an interval of disturbance to the site before it began to be excavated under proper archaeological direction, which has left the exact original location of some large fragments regrettably imprecise, allowing for prolonged arguments over which pieces belong to which group, and where the groups originally were, which have gradually been resolved as smaller pieces, recorded more professionally, are married up in the continuing process of reconstruction. In August 1957 Giulio Iacopi, an archaeologist at the Museo Nazionale Romano finally got permission to lead excavations and used the opportunity to further explore.

The four Odysseus groups show the different sides of his complex character, both good and bad: "all in all, the synthesis looks to be literary and Alexandrian, with its exaggeration of the hero's chameleon-like personality and its emphasis, over and above what is in Homer, upon the two extremes of his personality—his courage and his perfidy".

=== Pasquino group ===
"Pasquino group" is the name given to a sculptural group in Hellenistic style depicting a warrior supporting the dead body of a comrade, from the fragmentary but well known sculpture nicknamed the Pasquino still erected on a street in Rome. Though it shows some differences to other versions, the Sperlonga group are sufficiently close to be regarded as adaptations of the same original if, as most assume, Sperlonga is not the prime version of the composition, though it is the earliest to survive.

Usually, as with the Pasquino, the subject is taken to be Menelaus supporting the body of Patroclus, which has been suggested as the subject here, but most scholars agree it is here intended to show Odysseus carrying the body of the dead Achilles off the battlefield outside Troy (or possibly Ajax doing the carrying). This is an unusual subject, not in Homer, but one that is mentioned by Ovid (Metamorposes, 13, 282 ff) and fits the rest of the programme. Here Odysseus is shown at his most conventionally virtuous, demonstrating pietas. The four legs, two trailing on the ground, and the head of the living warrior are the main elements reconstructed so far.

=== Palladium group ===
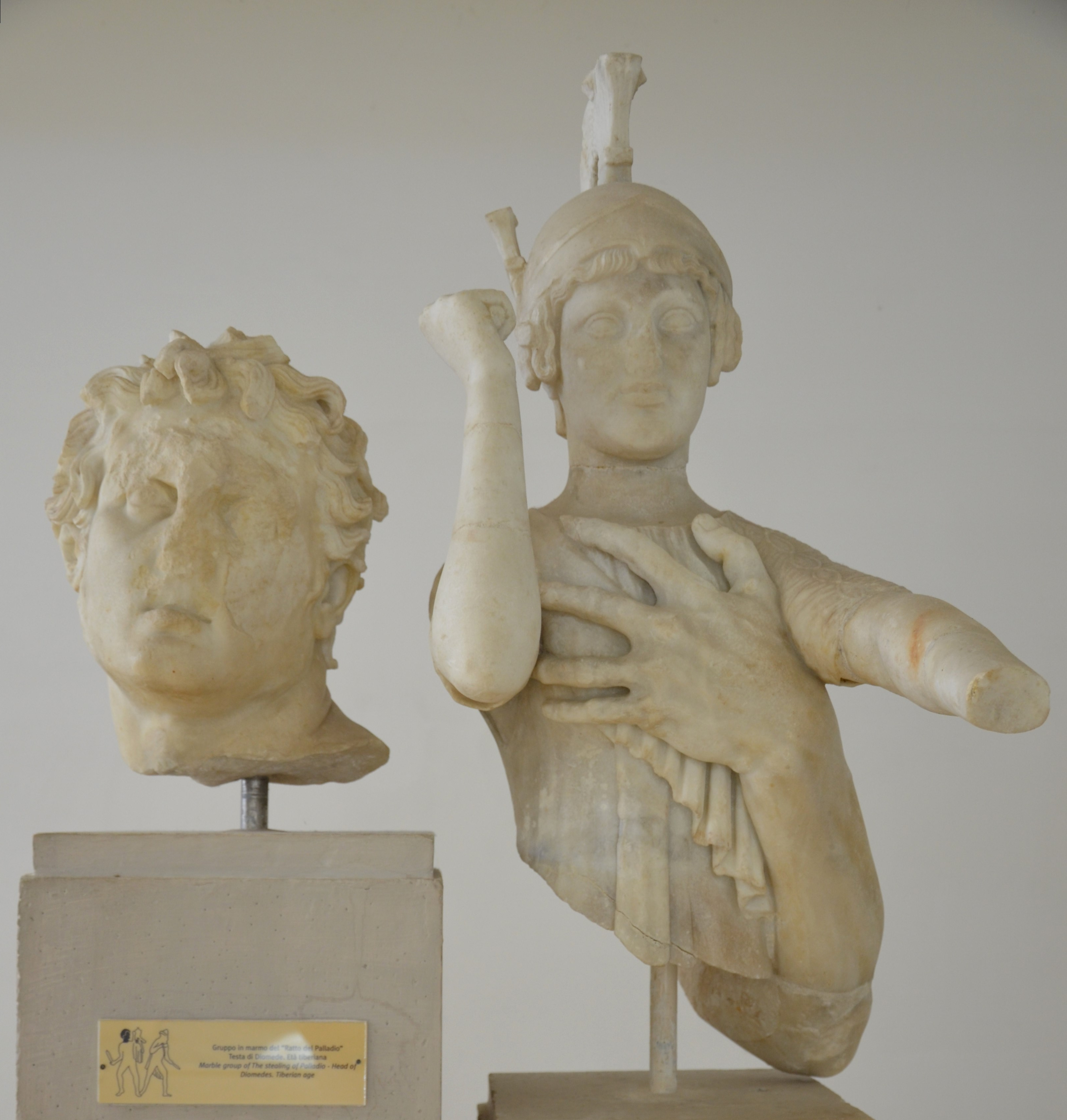
Diomedes' head, and the Palladium he grasps

This group also shows an unusual subject. It is mostly thought to represent the moment when, escaping after stealing the Palladium image which protected Troy, Odysseus tries to kill his comrade Diomedes in order to take all the credit himself. Diomedes senses Odysseus' drawn sword behind him, and stalls the attempt. This episode, also not in Homer, shows Odysseus at his least creditable, exhibiting dolus. In Metamorphoses 13, 337ff Odysseus boasts of his capture of the Palladium, just as some lines earlier he claims the credit for rescuing the body of Achilles. The episode took place at night, and may be imagined as dimly lit to heighten the effect.

The identification remains somewhat speculative, with the key reassembled piece being the top half of a roughly half-size figure of a helmeted Athena clutched by a roughly life-size hand. With this are associated a headless life-size figure who is not the owner of the clutching hand, and one or more heads. Odysseus may be the figure, with the head and clutching hand belonging to Diomedes. Some believe that the head and side of the torso of Odysseus in a Phrygian cap with his nose missing (illustrated) belongs here rather than with the Polyphemus group, as it is placed in the group reconstruction. The style of the face of the Palladium figure has been said to represent "a late stage in the transformation of Ionian Hellenistic fleshiness into Julio-Claudian classicism" with archaizing elements found in other Julio-Claudian sculpture.

=== Polyphemus group ===
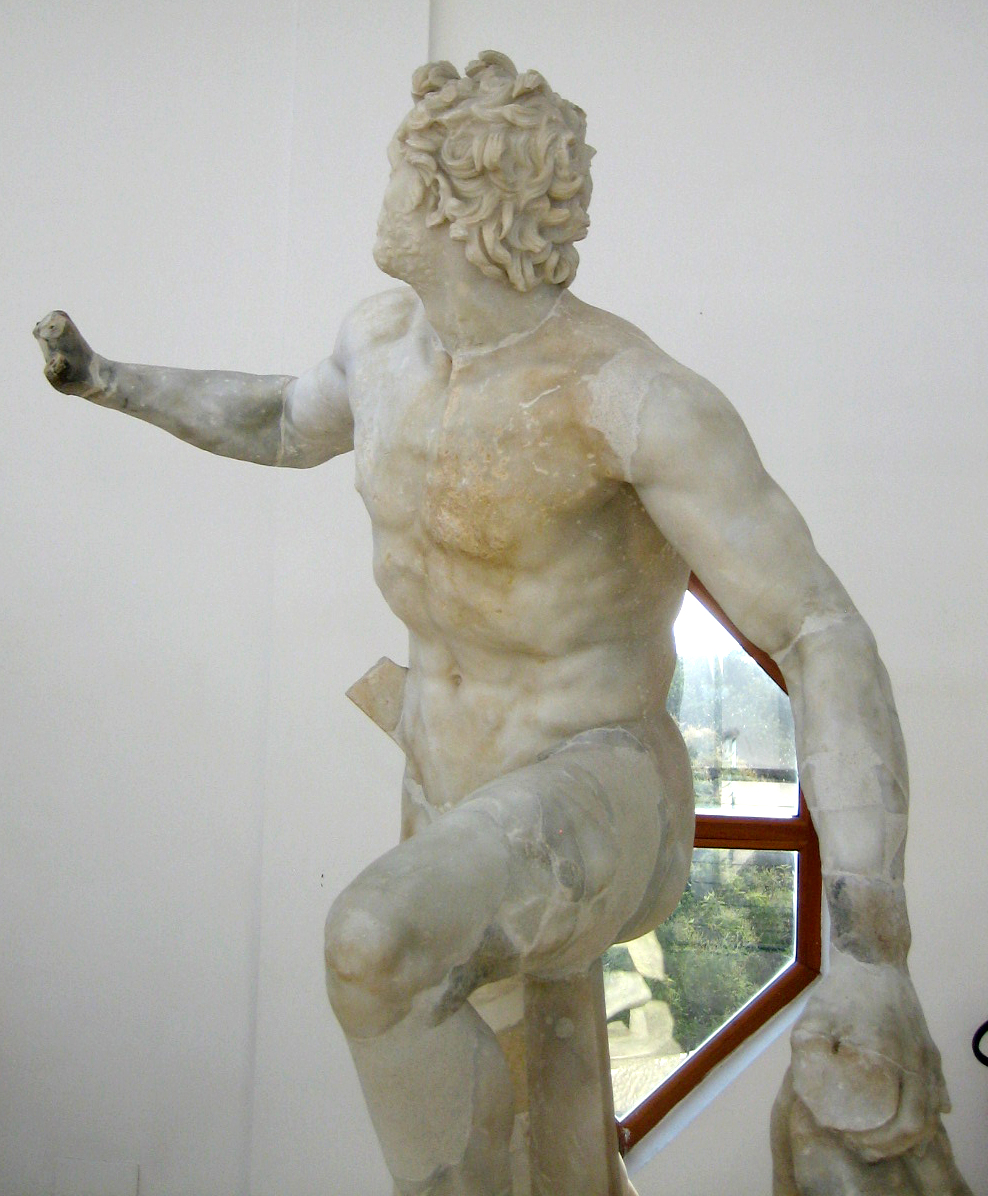
The much-discussed "wineskin-bearer", original as reconstructed

As recounted by Homer, the cyclops Polyphemus, who has trapped Odysseus and his crew in his cave home with a huge stone and begun to eat them, has been made drunk and fallen asleep. Odysseus cannot kill him as he would not be able to move the stone, so he heats the tip of a stake of olive wood in the cave in the fire and with that blinds the giant's only eye. The next day he and his men escape by clinging underneath Polyphemus' sheep as he lets them out to graze, feeling only their backs. The moment shown is when the heated stake is being raised into position, and at right one of the companions carrying the wine-skin creeps away trying not to wake the giant; this is perhaps the most complete of the original figures.

This was a more frequent subject in art, and with the Ganymede group is the only part of the whole for which no alternative subject has been suggested. It shows the famous and admired ruthless calliditas or cunning of Odysseus, together with his bravery. Of the three men wielding the shaft, in the cast reconstruction in the museum he is nearest the giant's eye, although this figure is placed by some scholars in the Palladium group instead. The placing of the wineskin-bearer, and whether he was an addition to the putative bronze model for the ensemble, have been much discussed. A 3rd century sarcophagus relief at Catania (illustrated below, including wineskin-bearer), is regarded as a simplified version of the Sperlonga Polyphemus group or its model, and was important as a basis for the reconstruction at Sperlonga.

The wineskin-bearer and the lowest companion on the shaft are two of the most complete figures to survive, while of Polyphemus only his head, one huge leg and one foot, one arm and the other hand have so far been pieced together; his reconstructed torso is largely guesswork. This group was the furthest away, at some 40 metres, from the triclinium, at the rear of the grotto to the right, but the visitor could pass in front of it and also mount some steps to the right to obtain much closer views.

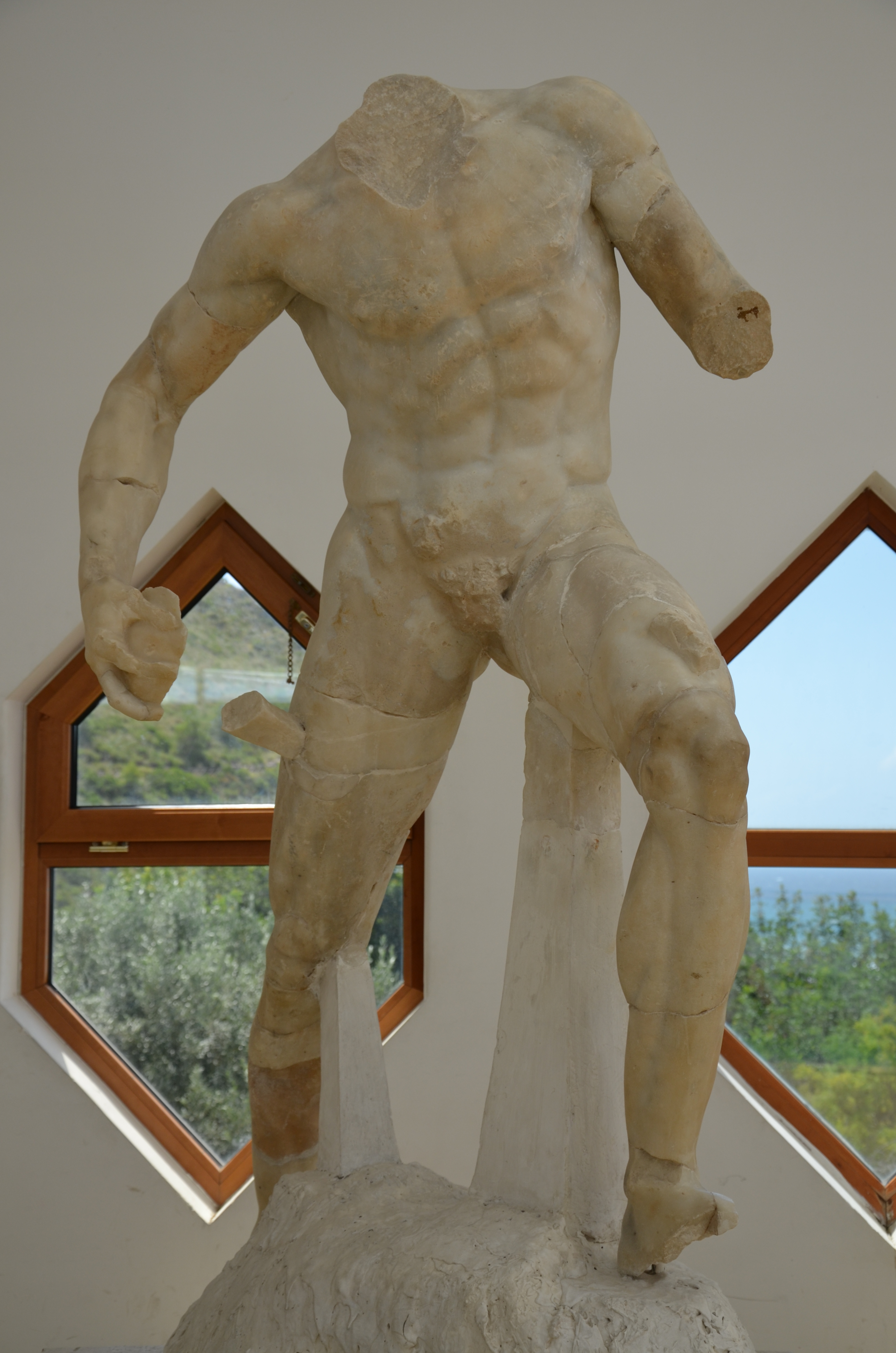
The lowest wielder of the shaft

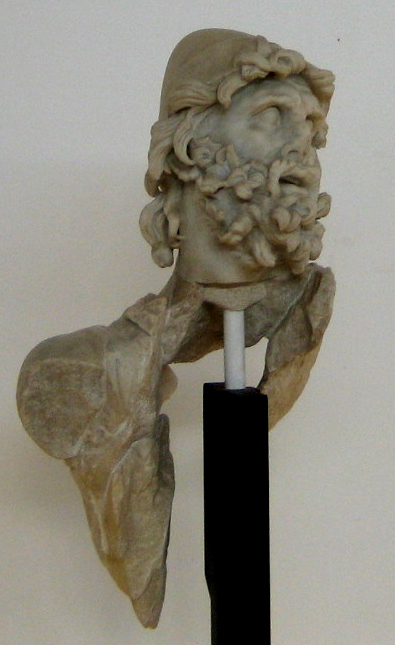
Odysseus' head and upper body from the Polyphemus group, original as reconstructed

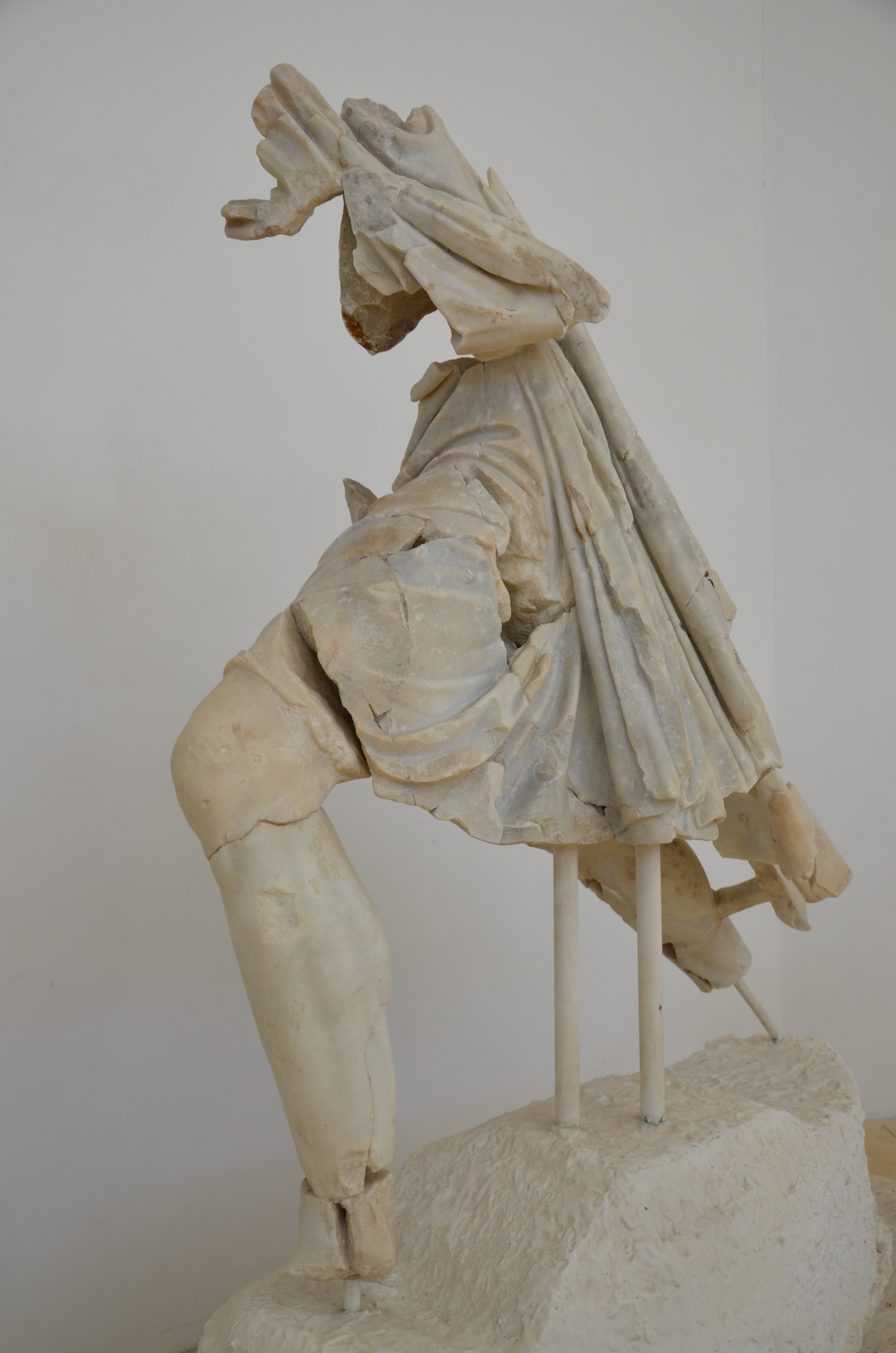
Odysseus' lower body

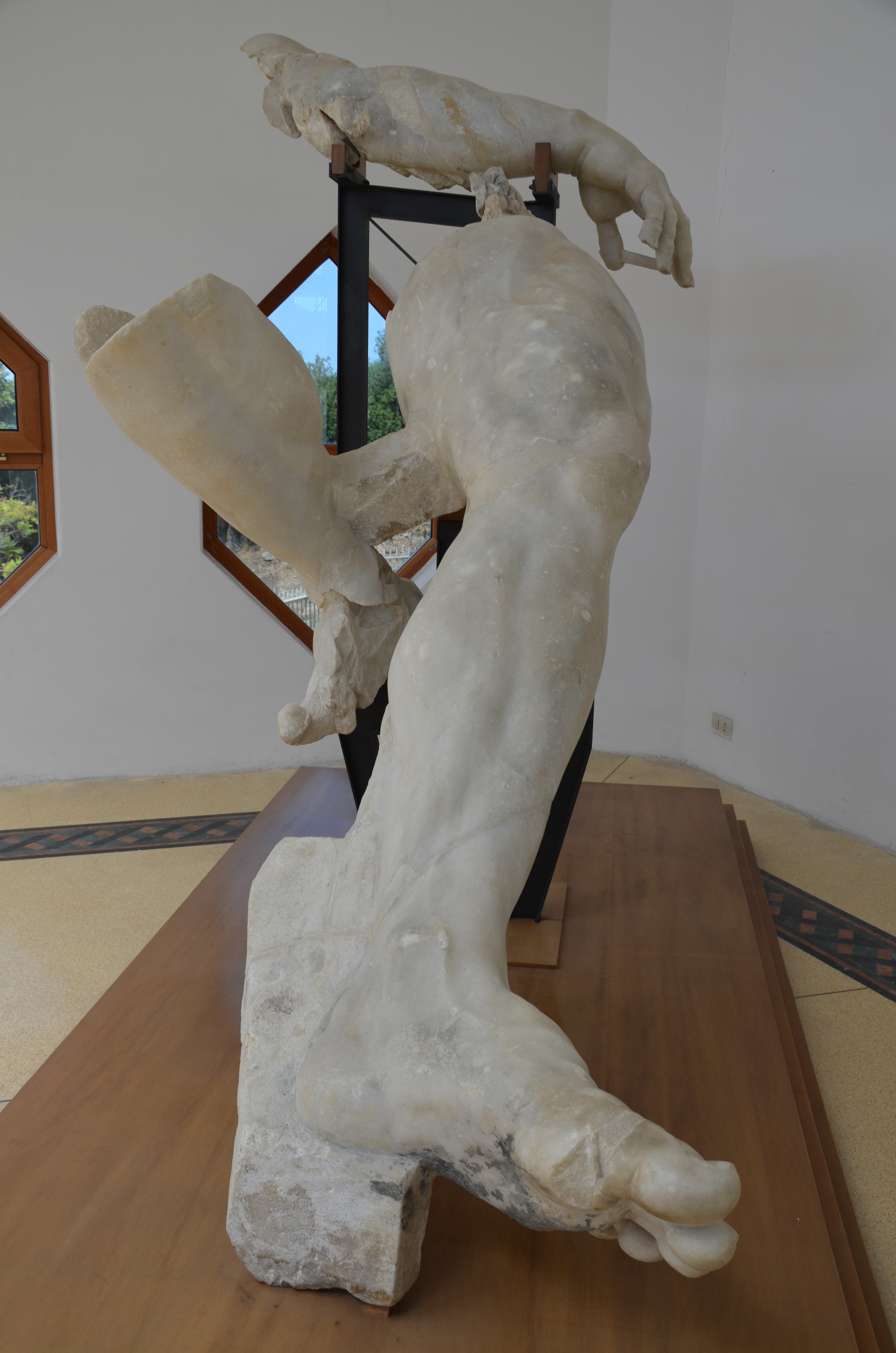
The reconstructed Polyphemus

=== Scylla group ===
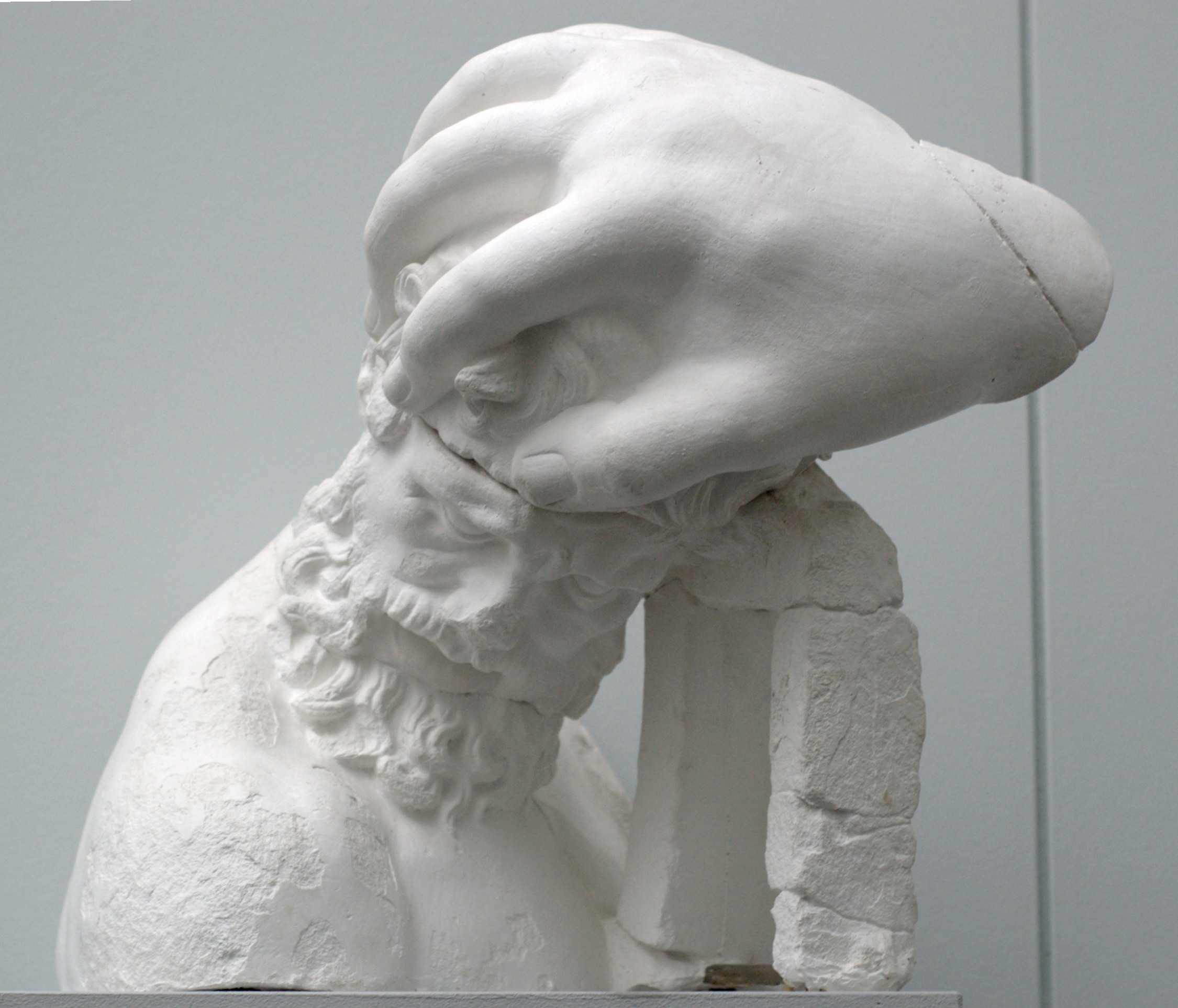
The hand of Scylla grasping a head (cast reconstruction)

This shows a section of Odysseus' ship attacked by the monster Scylla, whose body in Greek sources sprouted a whole range of tentacles and wolf-like heads. In art she was normally represented as an oversized female from the midriff up, with a ring of dog or wolf heads on long necks at the waist, and large tentacles or a long fishy tail as the lower parts. This was evidently the broad conception at Sperlonga, but the various fragments of ship, monster, attacked sailors and a monstrous hand grasping a head are somewhat uncertain in their relative positions, and "no fragments of the Skylla torso have as yet been recognised". Unlike the Polyphemus group, no overall reconstruction using casts and creative re-imagining is on display. The whole group was some 3 metres high, and the human figures are generally counted as five sailors and a pilot.

There is no fully comparable image, though fragments of what was probably a smaller group have been found in Hadrian's Villa at Tivoli (one illustrated below), in rather better condition. What evidence there is suggests that any earlier groups lacked the ship, and were less ambitious. A lost bronze group of uncertain date or appearance is later recorded in Constantinople, which has been suggested as a model, though there are problems with this idea. There are numerous scenes with the same basic components in much smaller objects, including coins.

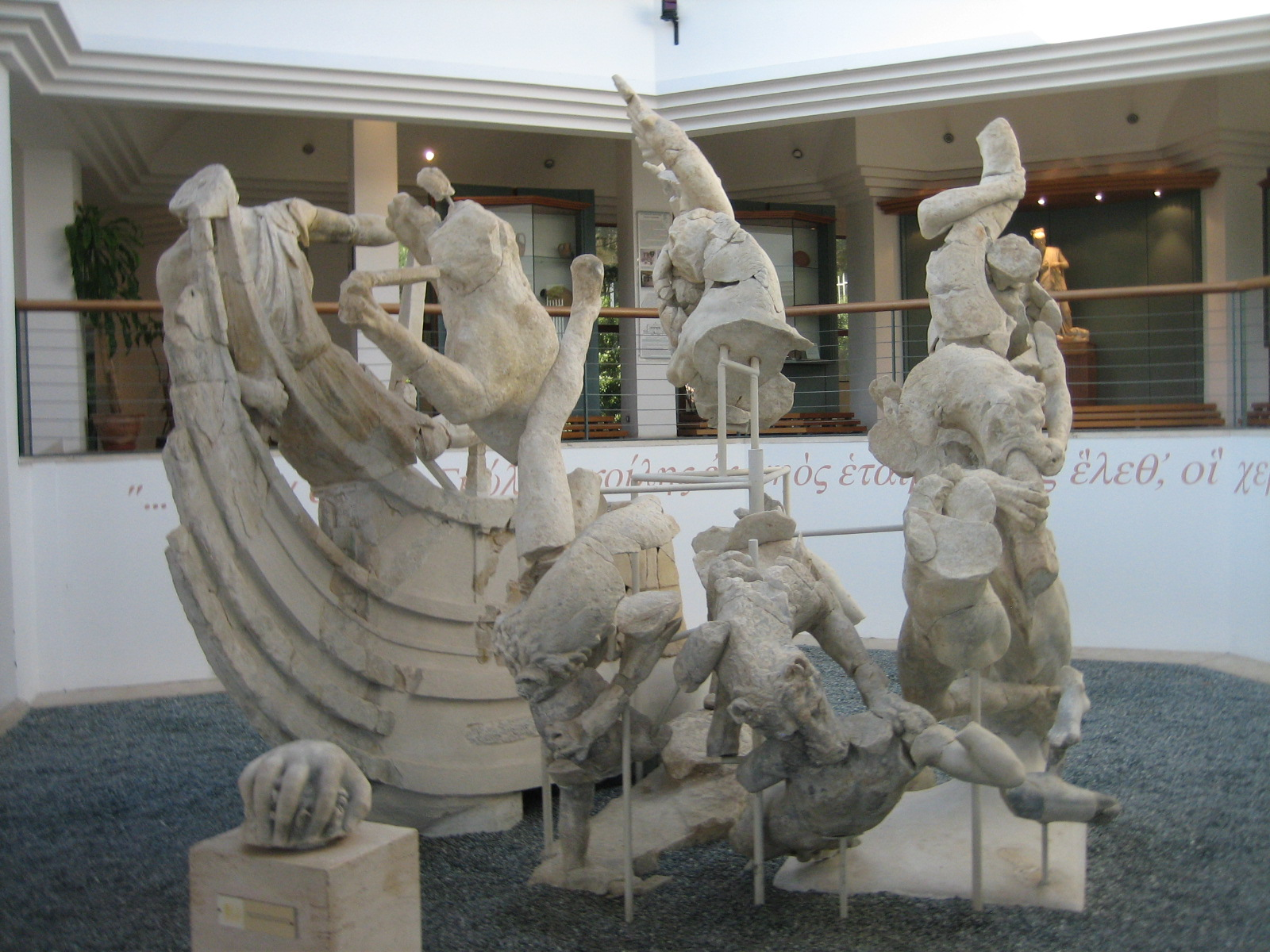
As displayed in 2012

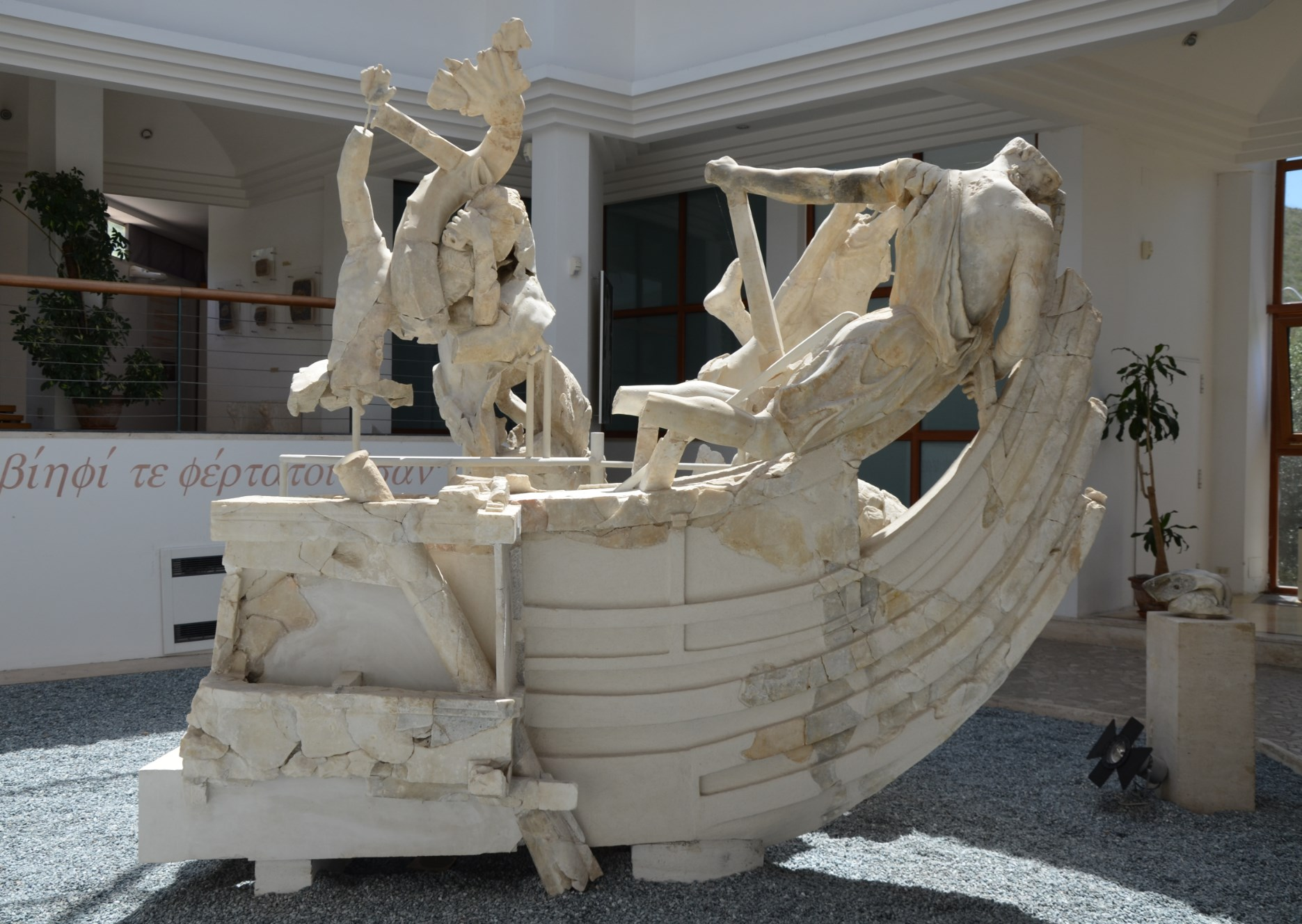
As displayed in 2014, other side

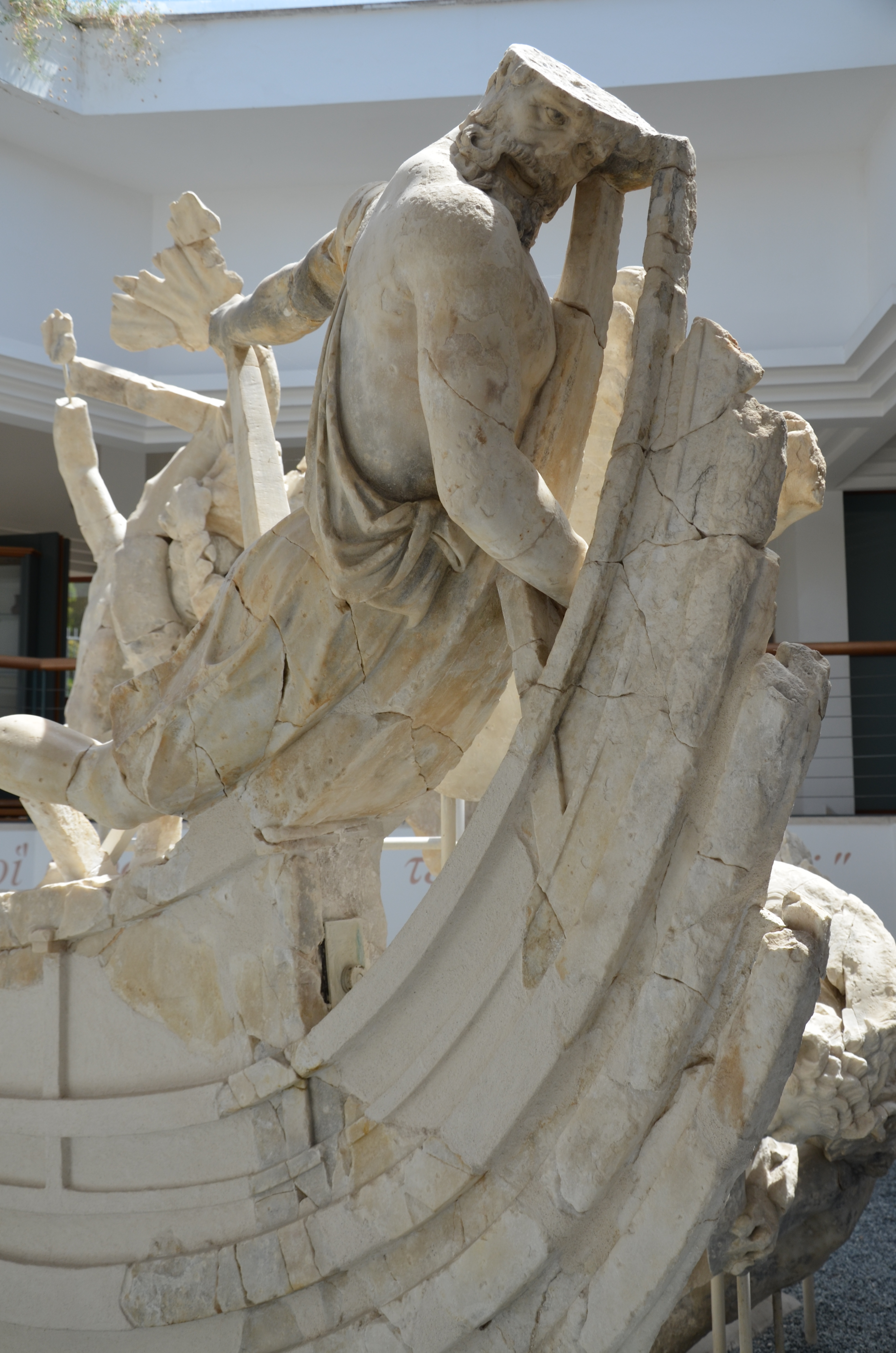

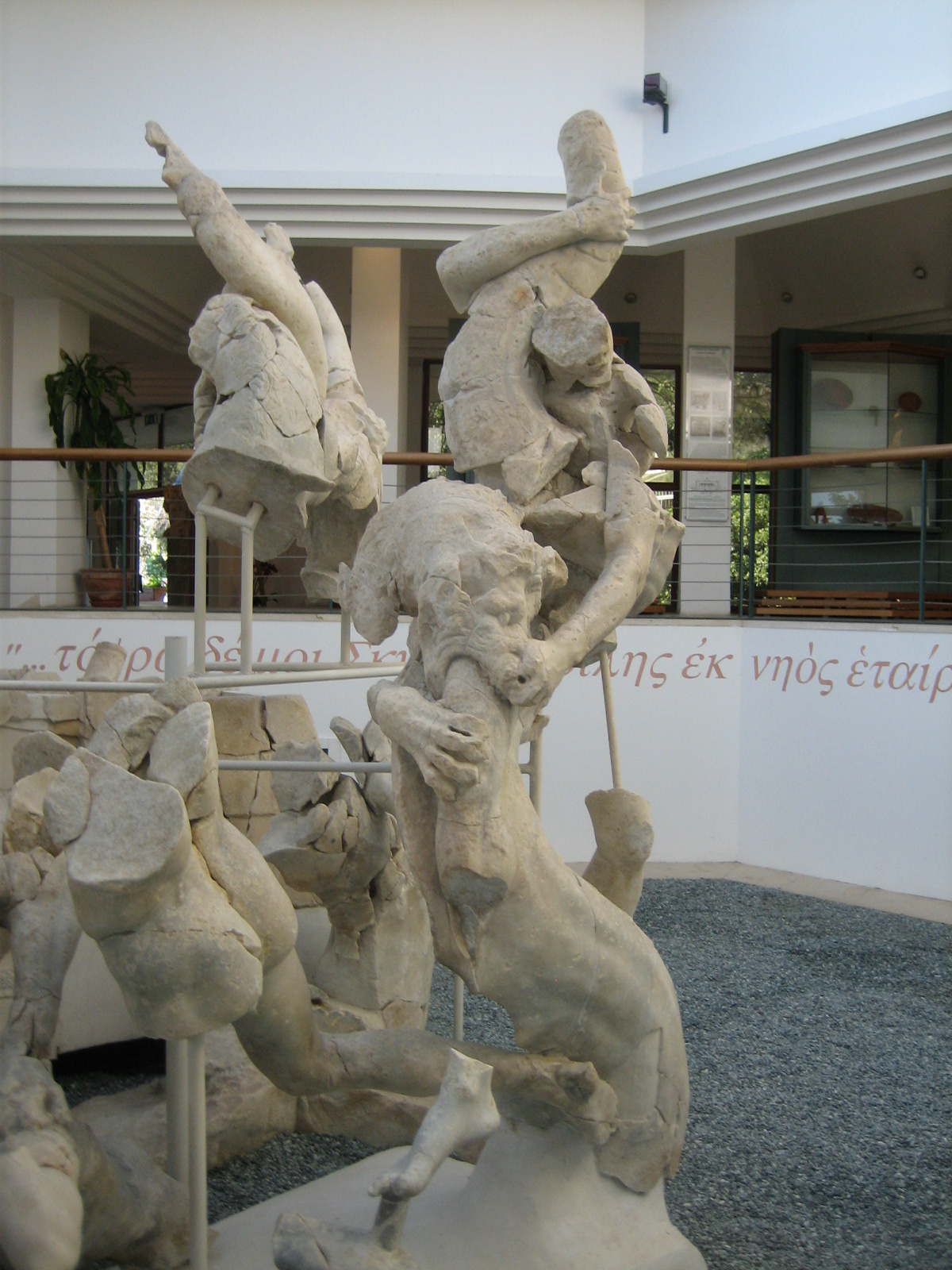

=== Ganymede and the Eagle ===
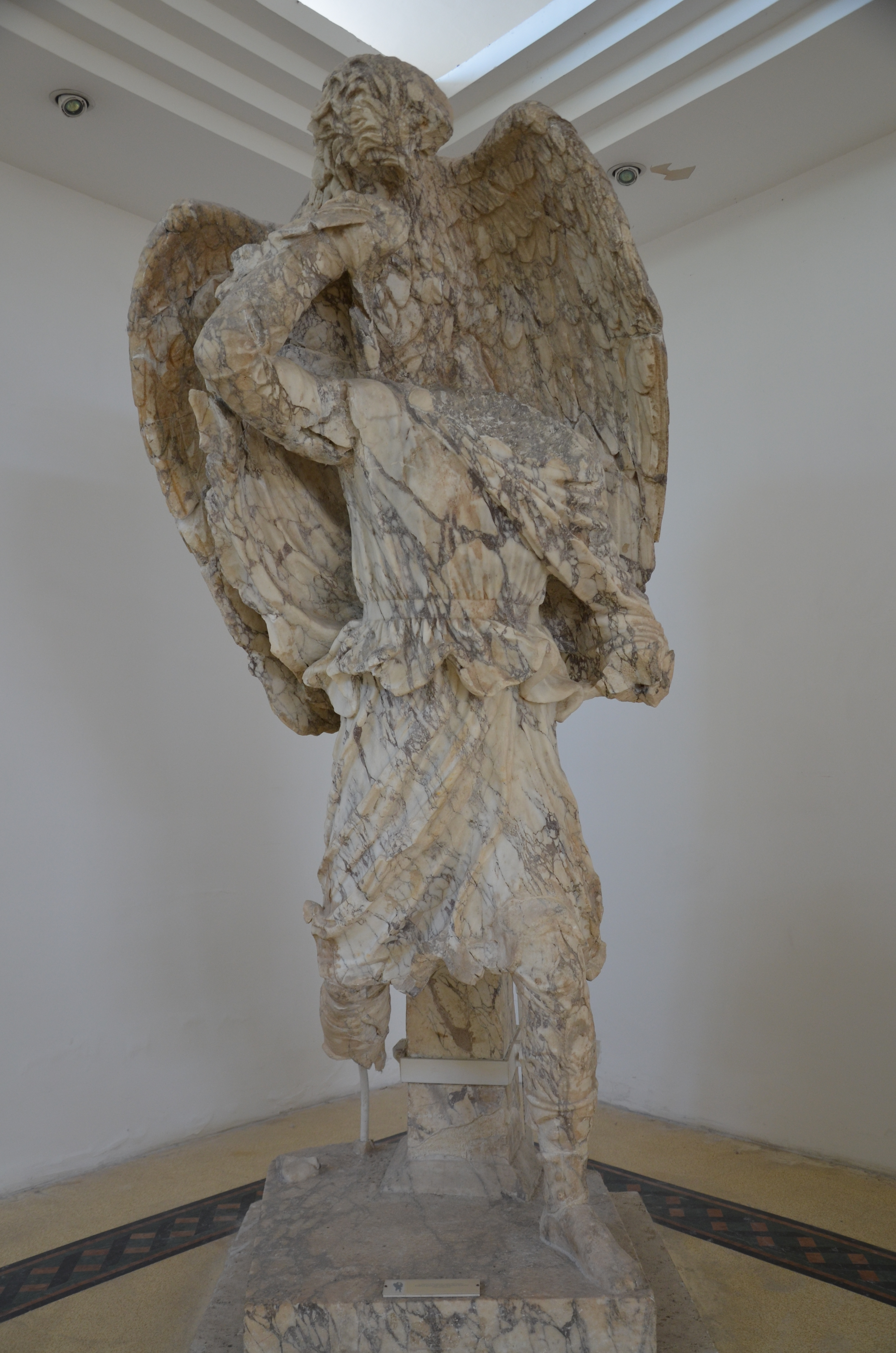
The original Ganymede from the cliff above the grotto

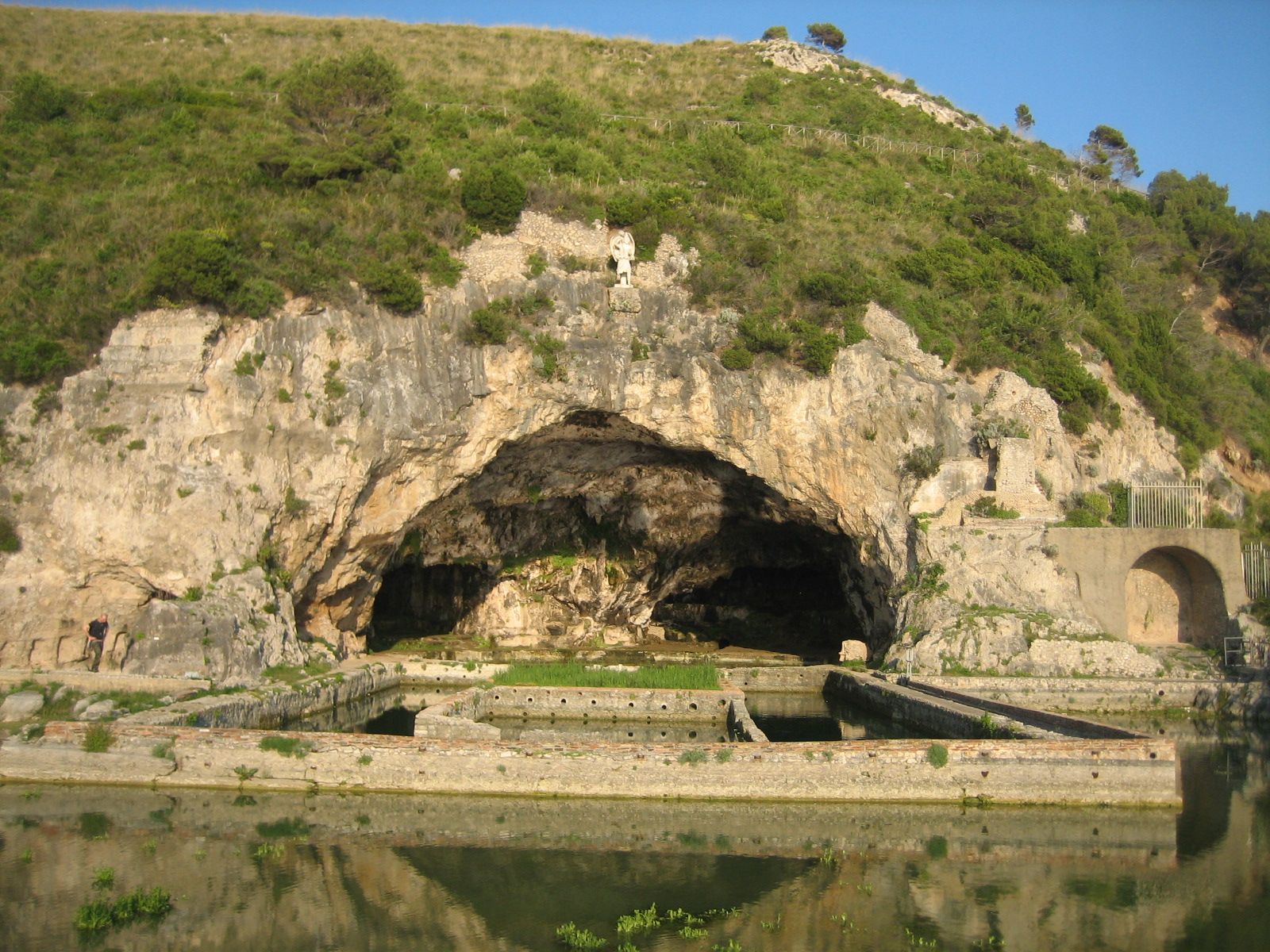
Ganymede replica in original position

The statue of Ganymede with Zeus as an eagle behind him was placed on a specially built masonry base high above the centre of the entrance to the grotto; a replica is now in the original position. Rather unusually, Ganymede is fully clothed, and, even more unusually, he wears the contemporary local folk costume of the part of Asia Minor around his homeland of Troy, or perhaps even further eastwards. His body is in Pavonazzetto, a luxury polychrome marble also from Phrygia, while his head is in a white marble that was most probably painted. Ganymede was a Trojan prince, in most versions of his myth the great-uncle of King Priam (sometimes the uncle or even brother), but this national aspect is rarely stressed in his story, and this "is the only known depiction of Ganymede as distinctively Trojan".

== Sculptors ==
A carved inscription on the ship in the Scylla group records the three sculptors responsible: "Athenodoros, son of Agesander", "Agesandros, son of Paionios" (Paionios is a rare name) and "Polydoros, son of Polydoros". These are the same three names, though not in the same order, who Pliny the Elder records as the sculptors of the group of Laocoön and His Sons owned by the Emperor Titus in about 70 AD, which is generally considered to be the famous group excavated in Rome in 1506 and now in the Vatican Museums. Pliny lists them in the order Agesander, Athenodoros, and Polydorus, giving no fathers, but saying they were from the Greek island of Rhodes.

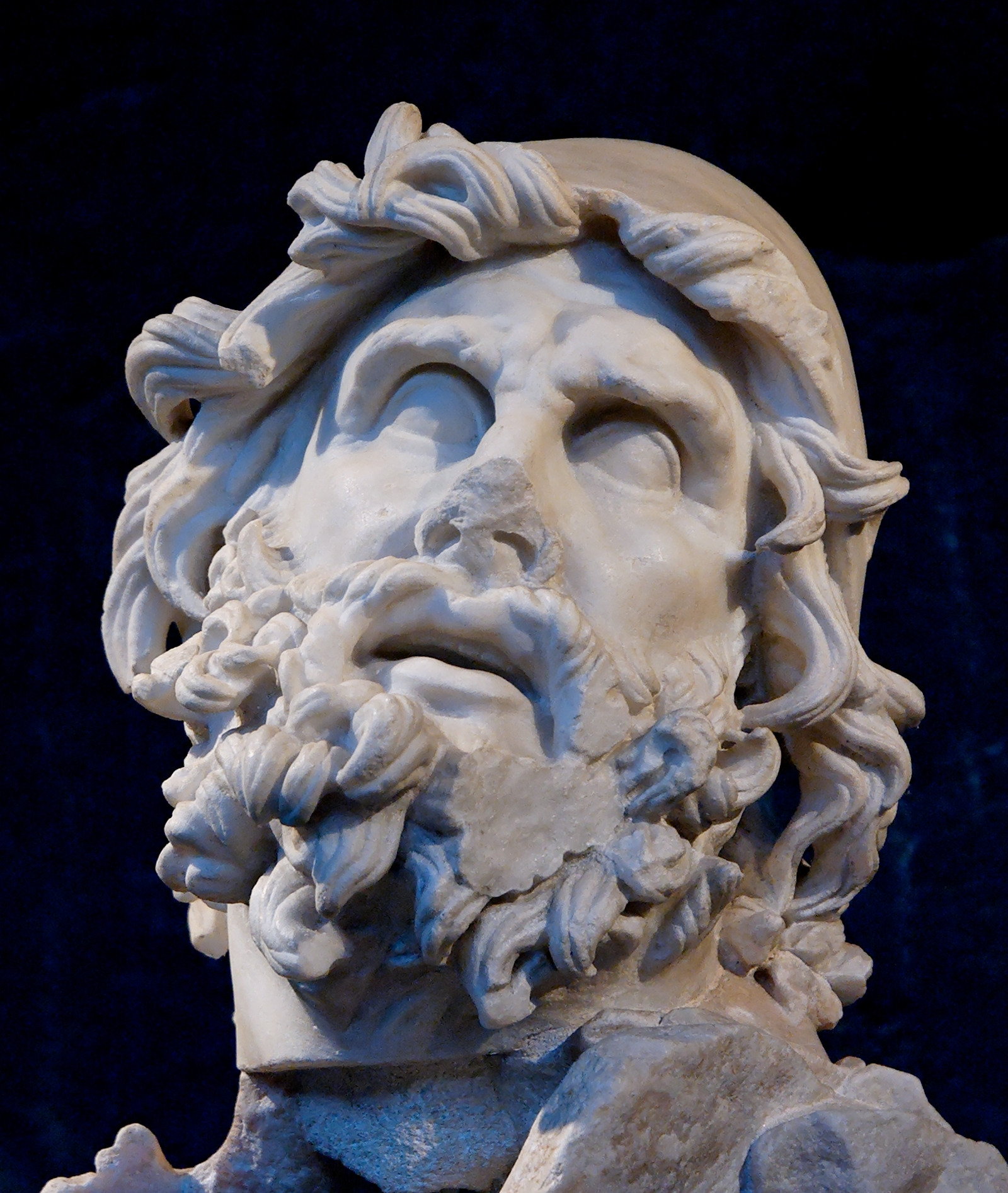
Detail of the head of Odysseus

It is thought that strict seniority governed the sequence of names in such cases and, barring a simple mistake by Pliny, that it cannot be the same Agesander in both Pliny, where Agesander is listed first, and Sperlonga, where Agesander comes second. It was common for Rhodians to be named after their grandfathers, with the same names alternating over many generations for as long as several centuries. An inscription on a base for a statue at Lindos, firmly dated to 42 BC, records "Athenodorus, son of Agesander", but again it is unclear how these two names relate to the other references – in fact both names were very common on Rhodes, though infrequent elsewhere. Conversely Polydorus, the last named in both inscriptions, is generally a common Greek name, but much less so on Rhodes, and as a sculptor seems only known from Pliny and Sperlonga, whereas an Athenodorus was evidently famous, recorded on several bases for sculptures (all found or recorded detached from their sculptures), more as a label or caption than a signature. In some he is again "Athenodorus, son of Agesander". This is also the name of a priest recorded in an inscription at Lindos datable to 22 BC, which also records a possible brother "Agesander, son of Agesander"; either of these might have been sculptors also, or not.

The Sperlonga sculptures are in a similar style to the Laocoön, but with many significant differences, not least in quality, being uneven but generally of much lower skill and finish, though the ensemble is also considerably larger, and would have required many assistants to the masters.

== Date and originality ==
Scholarly argument over the precise dating of the group and related issues, the so-called "War of Sperlonga", has continued ever since the discovery, as a spill-over from the arguments about the Laocoön, which were already two centuries old. The collapse of the grotto recorded in 26 AD provides a terminus ante quem, and has implications for the Laocoön, which some would like to date as late as about 70 AD. The earliest date proposed for the Sperlonga groups is about 50 BC, though as with the Laocoön there is a further question as to whether, in whole or part, they are copies of earlier works.

Some scholars see clear indications that the programme of the groups was specifically designed for Tiberius, while others think the group predates his ownership of the villa by some decades. Various degrees of adaptation of earlier models, probably in bronze, to fit both the Sperlonga setting and the requirements of the conceptual programme are allowed for. For Peter von Blanckenhagen the two larger groups should be understood "neither as genuine originals nor as true replicas but as highly inventive and novel versions of only thematically similar Hellenistic groups in much smaller scale", while the two smaller groups are closer copies of originals. R.R.R. Smith (Bert/Roland) sees the four groups as reproductions of earlier groups in bronze, with the Scylla group perhaps a more free and inventive adaptation. The "high-class reproduction of Hellenistic mythological groups ... was clearly a limited, specialized market. Princes and emperors were buyers" and "these sculptors were probably the best of their day."

Some see the sculptures as made in Rhodes to fit the Sperlonga grotto, hence the intensive use of struts, while others note that it is much easier to move sculptors than sculptures. The origin of the marble has not been clearly established, which might throw further light on the issue. Historians of Roman building techniques generally date the setting for the sculptures, including the pool edges and other elements, to the 1st century BC.

Parts of the sculptures can be closely related to pieces from other sources. In particular a head in the British Museum (illustrated below) is very close to that of the "wineskin-bearer", one of the companions usually placed in the Polyphemus group: "It is astonishingly close in style and detail to the Sperlonga head, and shows that both are highly accurate copies of a common model". This was found in the pantanella of Hadrian's Villa at Tivoli by Gavin Hamilton in about 1769, and subsequently formed one of the Towneley Marbles collection bought by the museum. Hadrian's Villa also had a reduced version of the Scylla group, as part of its collection of copies of the most famous works of Greek sculpture (illustration below); the Catania Polyphemus relief is mentioned above. The scales of the Sperlonga groups are slightly inconsistent, which is argued as evidence of a set of different original models for the groups.

Rival literary sources have been claimed for the sculptural programme, as seen in the two German books Sperlonga und Vergil by Roland Hampe (1972) and Praetorium Speluncae: Tiberius und Ovid in Sperlonga by Bernard Andreae (1994), which proposed that Ovid himself advised Tiberius on the programme, or devised it, which was then specified for the sculptors. Peter Green and others have said this is implausible given that Ovid was exiled, never to return, in 8 AD. Hampe's Virgilian interpretation goes further than others in proposing that the helmsman on the boat in the Scylla group is not Odysseus or one of his crew but Palinurus, Aeneas's helmsman in Virgil's Aeneid, but this idea has received little support.

=== Gallery of related pieces ===
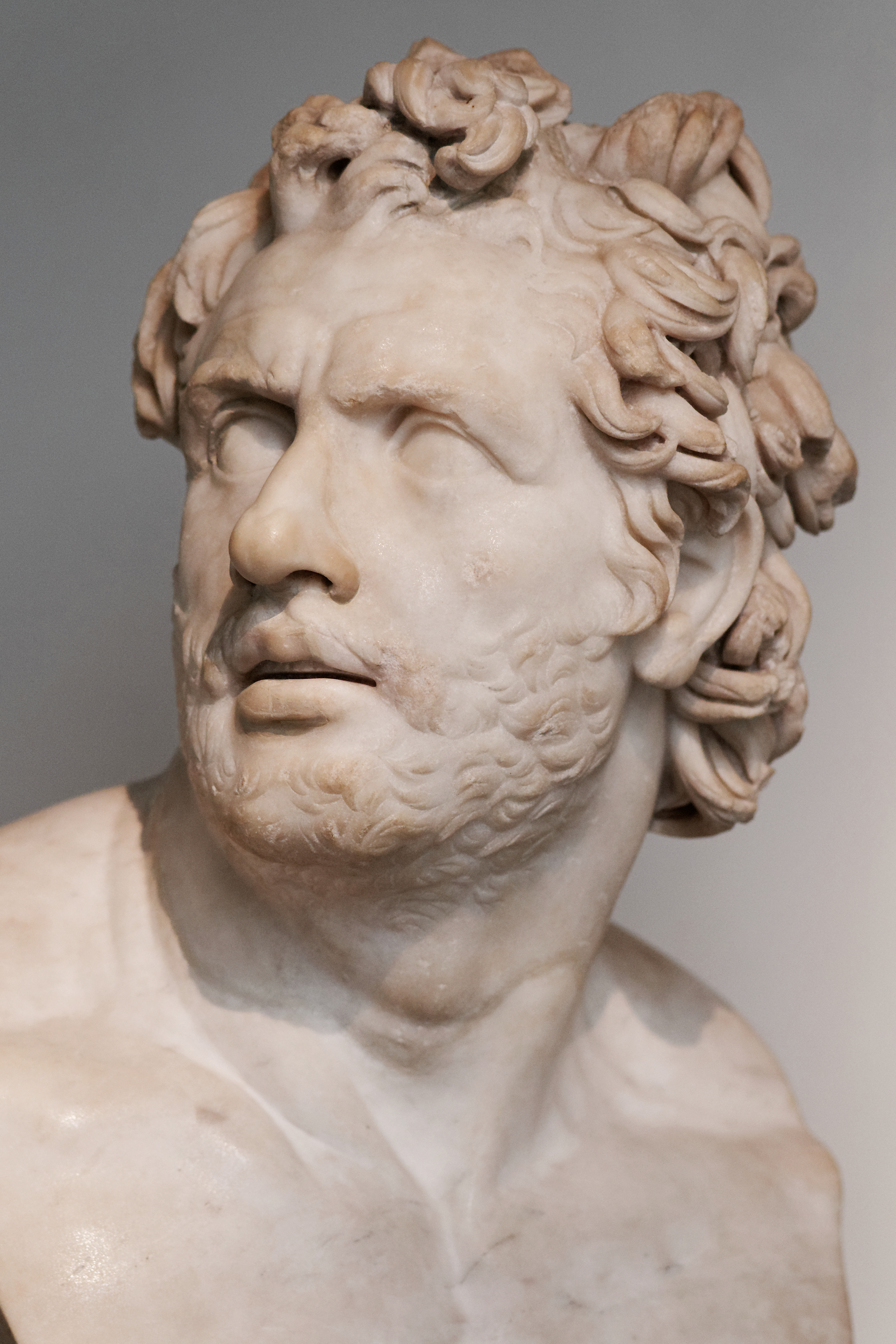
The Companion of Odysseus (the "wineskin-bearer") in the British Museum; the bust, nose and lips are restorations.

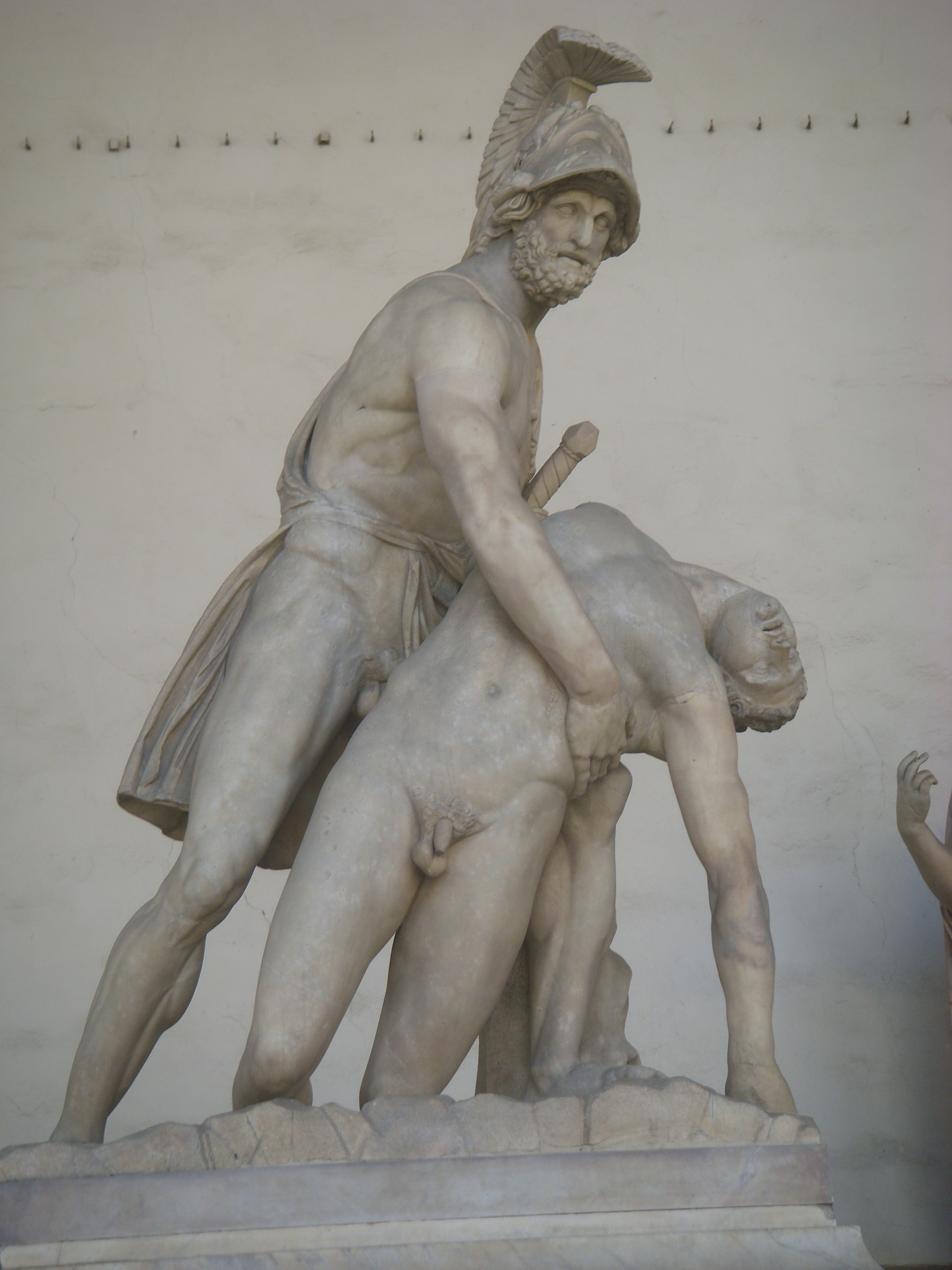
The Pasquino group in the Piazza della Signoria in Florence, Flavian copy of Hellenistic original, much restored.

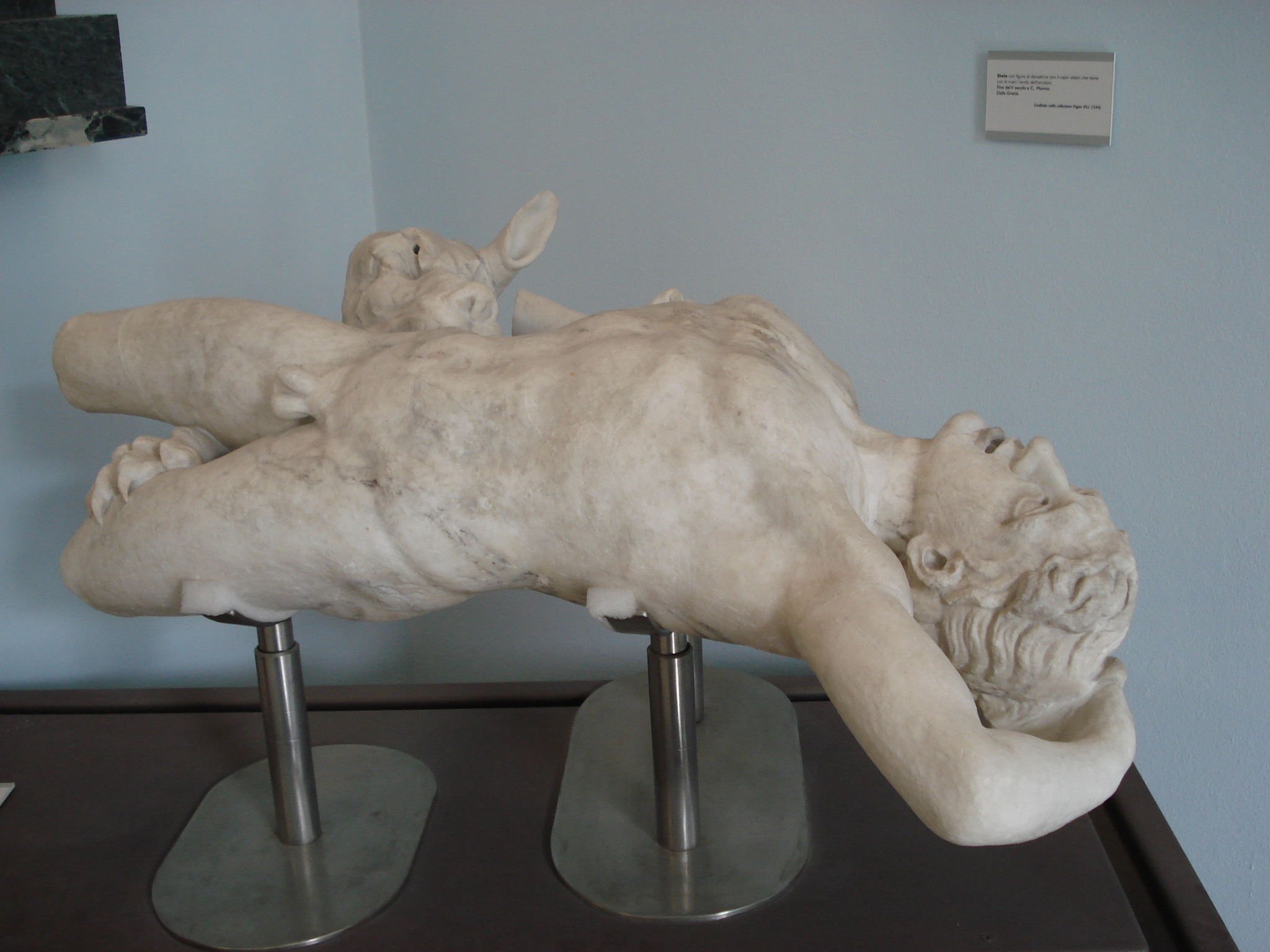
A companion of Odysseus being attacked by one of Scylla's dog-heads. From Hadrian's Villa. In the Sperlonga reconstruction the equivalent figure is vertical and upside down.

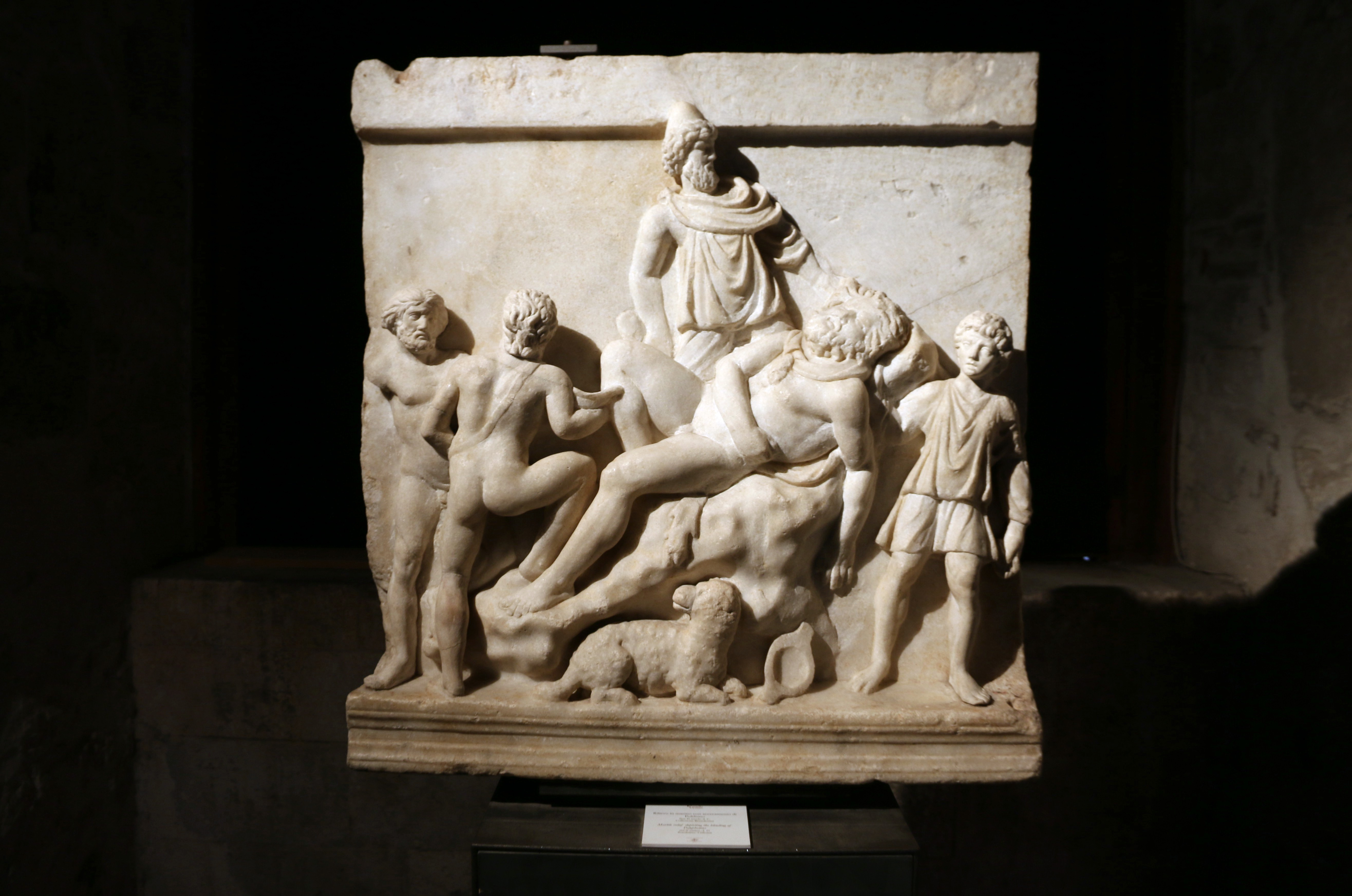
3rd century sarcophagus relief at Catania, regarded as a simplified version of the Sperlonga group, or its model.

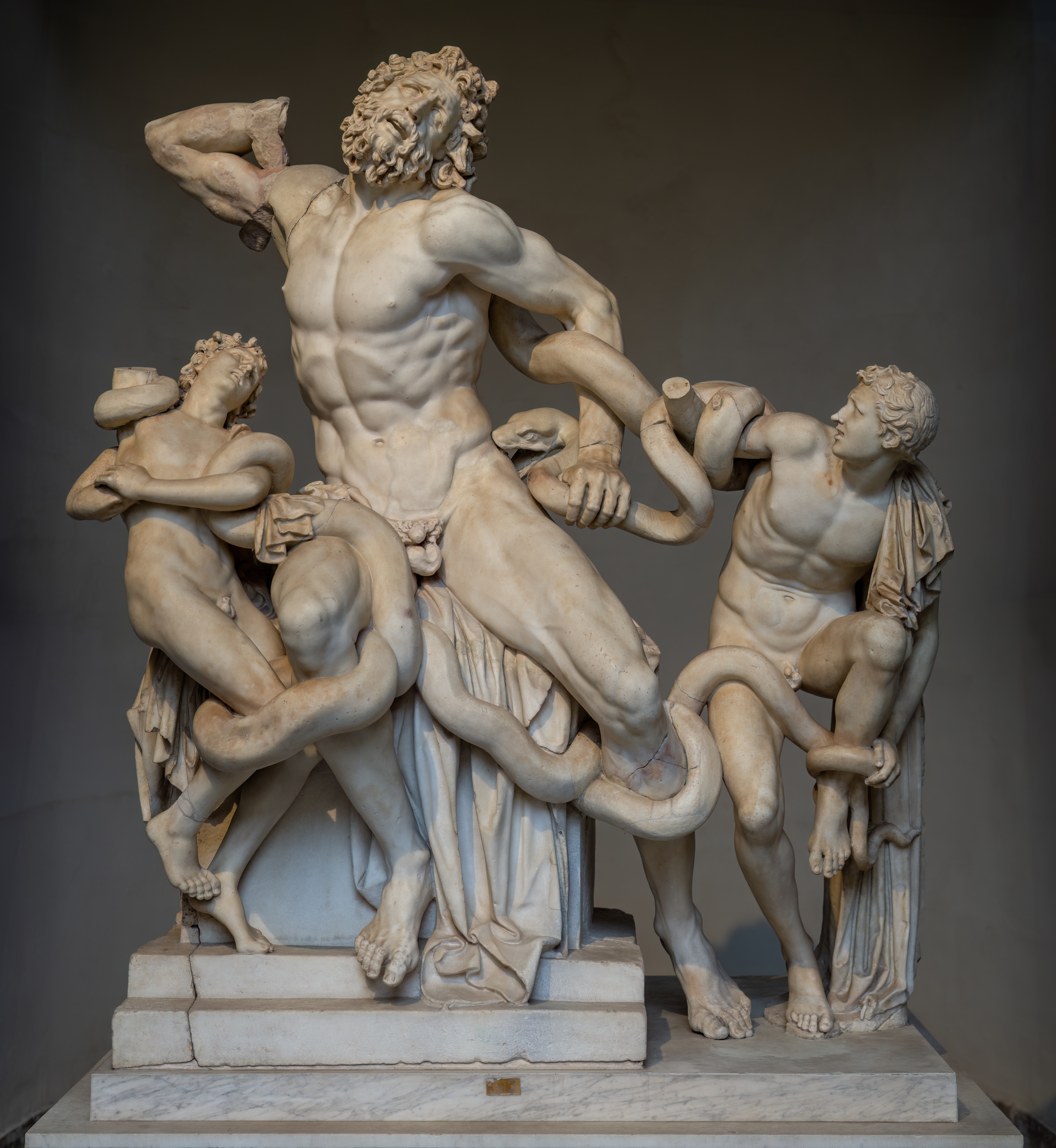
Laocoön and His Sons in the Vatican Museums

=== A commission by Tiberius? ===
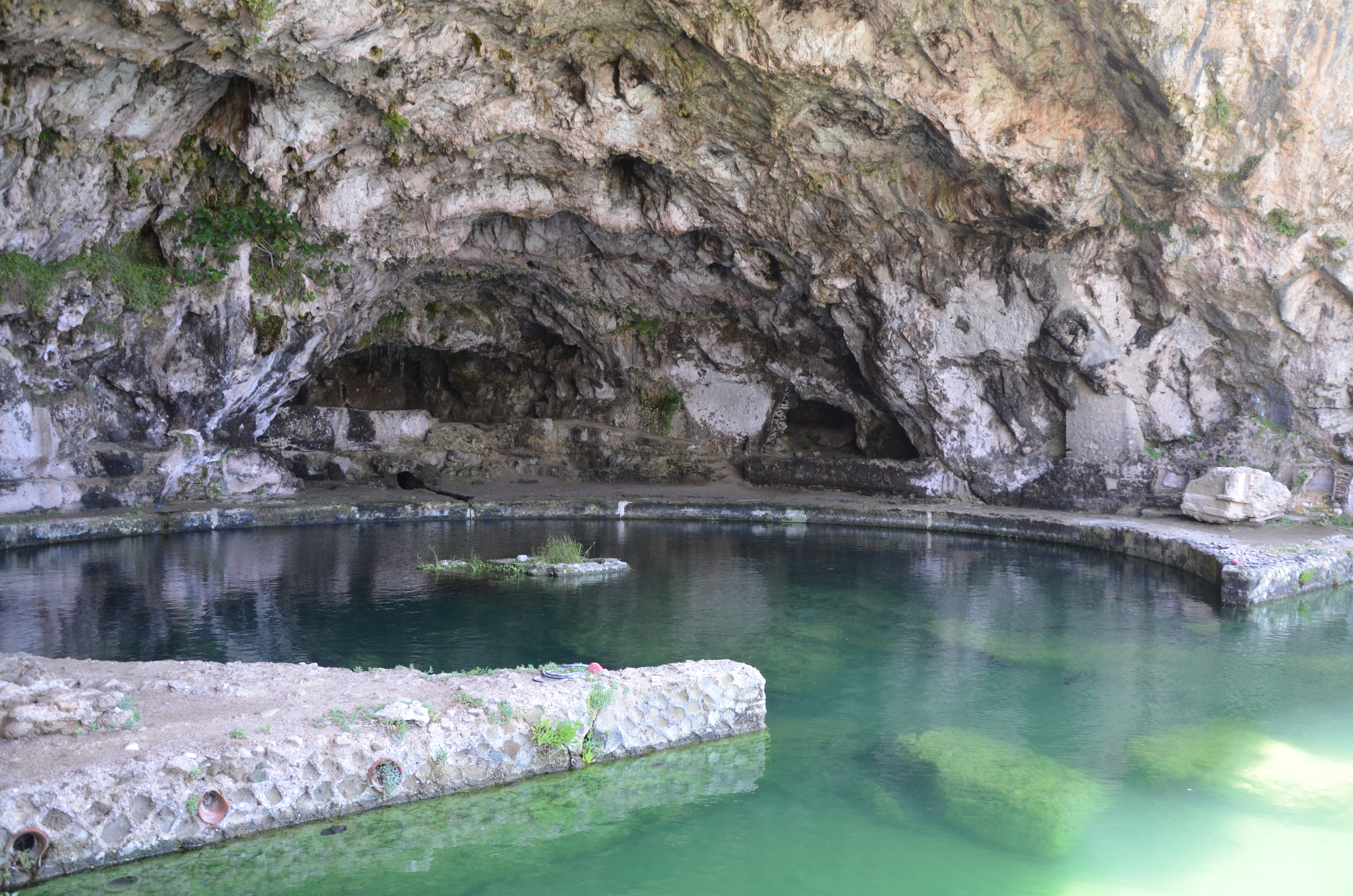
Sideways view inside the grotto

The case for the Odysseus cycle being a commission by Tiberius rests on several lines of argument. He is firmly connected with the grotto by Tacitus and Suetonius, and most scholars accept that he owned it and the villa above, which seems to date back to the late Republic.

It has been argued that the unusual programme reflects Tiberius' particular ancestry, his literary tastes, and his personality and political outlook, and that he may have identified himself with Odysseus in a special way; Juvenal was later to compare them. It has also been argued that Tiberius set a precedent for Imperial depictions of scenes with Odysseus and Polyphemus that was later followed by Claudius, Nero and Hadrian.

In terms of the legendary ancestry claimed by several of the leading Roman families, Tiberius was a descendant by birth of Odysseus though the gens Claudia, and also, by his adoption by Augustus into the gens Julia, of Aeneas, the Trojan prince and founder of Rome. His literary tastes favoured the contemporary Greek authors, mostly now lost, and recherché corners of Greek mythology—Suetonius tells how he liked to quiz his "retinue of pedants" over dinner, and the "combination of bookishness and horror, in what is, after all, dining-room decoration" has been thought to reflect the "personal idiosyncrasy" of his tastes. He was a keen, even pedantic, gourmet, and dining was one of the few things he was willing to spend money on.

Tiberius had spent a period in effective exile on Rhodes, where it is suggested by proponents of his role that would have come to know the workshop or artists responsible, and developed a taste for their style, and possibly seen earlier versions of some or all of the groups. Later in life, he was probably responsible for another set of sculptural decorations in the Blue Grotto, Capri, this time in a natural pool-cave with water to the walls.

== Accounts of the fall in AD 26 ==
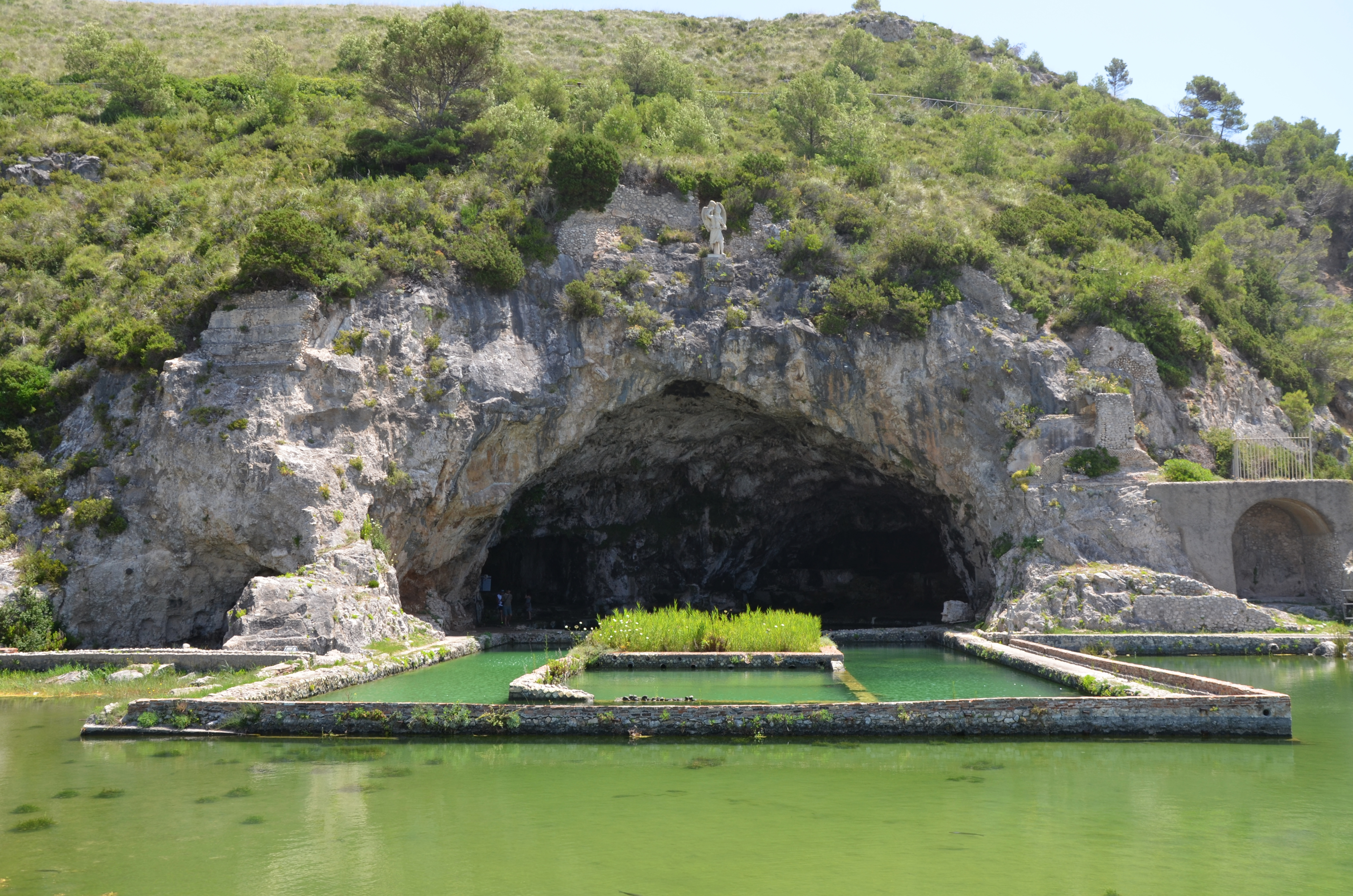
The grotto and cliff in 2010, with the replica Ganymede above

Tacitus, Annales, 4.59 (Latin text in note):

It happened at this time that a perilous accident which occurred to the emperor strengthened vague rumours and gave him grounds for trusting more fully in the friendship and fidelity of Sejanus. They were dining in a country house called "The Cave," between the gulf of Amuclæ and the hills of Fundi, in a natural grotto. The rocks at its entrance suddenly fell in and crushed some of the attendants; thereupon panic seized the whole company and there was a general flight of the guests. Sejanus hung over the emperor, and with knee, face, and hand encountered the falling stones; and was found in this attitude by the soldiers who came to their rescue. After this he was greater than ever, and though his counsels were ruinous, he was listened to with confidence, as a man who had no care for himself.

Suetonius, The Twelve Caesars, "Tiberius", 39:

...as he was dining near Tarracina in a villa called the Grotto, many huge rocks fell from the ceiling and crushed a number of the guests and servants, while the emperor himself had a narrow escape.

...iuxta Tarracinam in praetorio, cui Speluncae nomen est, incenante eo complura et ingentia saxa fortuito superne dilapsa sunt, multisque convivarum et ministrorum elisis praeter spem evasit.

The word praetorium is only used elsewhere in Suetonius to denote an Imperial palace.
