= Athenodorus of Rhodes =

Ancient Greek sculptor

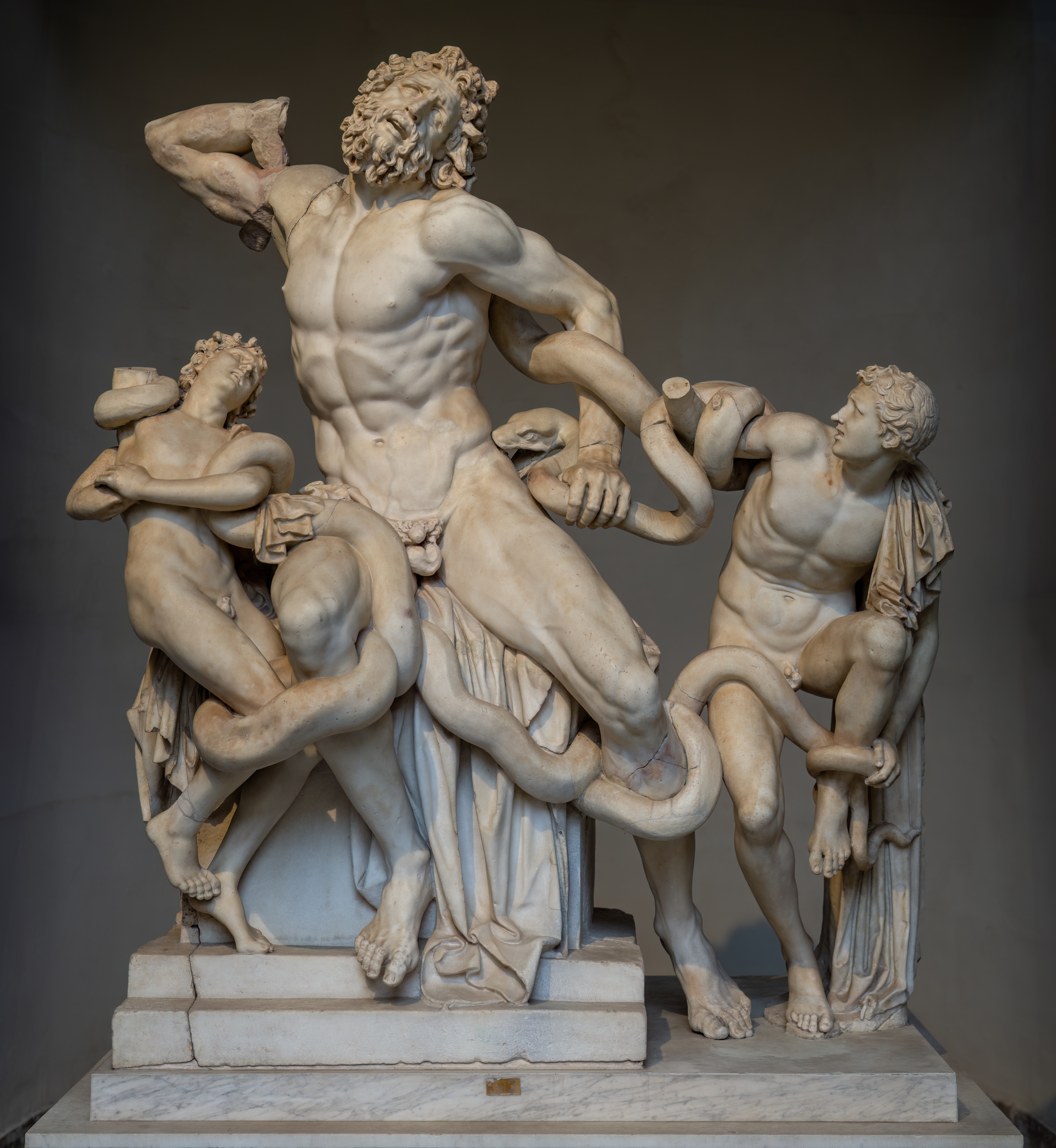
Laocoön and His Sons, by Agesander, Athenodorus, and Polydorus

Athenodorus (Ancient Greek: Ἀθηνόδωρος) of Rhodes was a sculptor of ancient Greece who lived around the 1st century CE. He was probably the son and pupil of Agesander of Rhodes, and brother of the sculptor Polydorus, with both of whom he assisted in executing the famous Laocoön and His Sons now in the Vatican Museums; these three names are given by Pliny the Elder, describing what is generally accepted to be the same sculpture.

However, since Rhodian sculpting dynasties often used the same names in different generations, other relationships between the three are possible. Various other sculptures, or bases for sculptures, record an Athenodorus, but whether these refer to the same sculptor, or how to group them, remains the subject of scholarly discussion. The situation is similar with Agesander of Rhodes, whom Pliny names first.

In the 18th century, the art historian Johann Joachim Winckelmann (who wildly misdated the group) speculated that Agesander sculpted the figure of the father, and each of his two sons executed one of the sons, but this has not been accepted by later scholars.
