= Agesander of Rhodes =

Ancient Greek sculptor (1st century BC/AD)

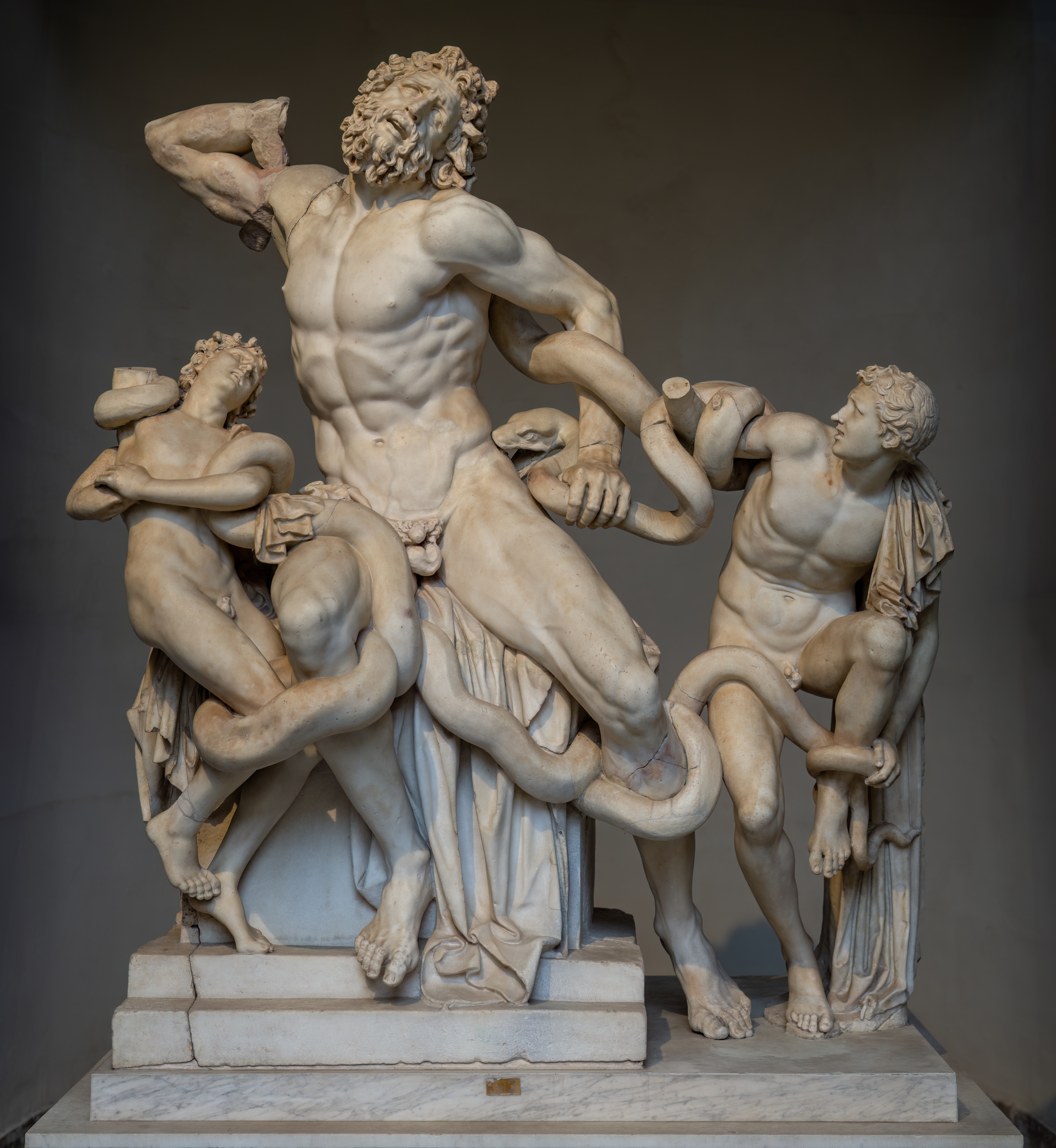
Laocoön and His Sons, by Agesander, Athenodorus, and Polydorus

Agesander (also Agesandros, Hagesander, Hagesandros, or Hagesanderus; Ancient Greek: Ἀγήσανδρος or Ancient Greek: Ἁγήσανδρος) was one, or more likely, several Greek sculptors from the island of Rhodes, working in the first centuries BC and AD, in a late Hellenistic "baroque" style. If there was more than one sculptor called Agesander they were very likely related to each other. The very important works of the groups of Laocoön and His Sons, in the Vatican Museums, and the sculptures discovered at Sperlonga are both signed by three sculptors including an Agesander.

== Sculptures ==
The name Agesander is only found in ancient literature in Pliny the Elder, but occurs in several inscriptions, though between them these certainly refer to a number of different individuals. Until the discovery at Sperlonga in 1959, only one work which Agesander executed was known, although this is one of the most famous of all classical sculptures. Pliny records that in conjunction with Athenodorus and Polydorus, Agesander sculpted Laocoön and his Sons, although modern art historians generally view the trio as being either "high-class copyists", or working in a Pergamese baroque style created some two centuries earlier.

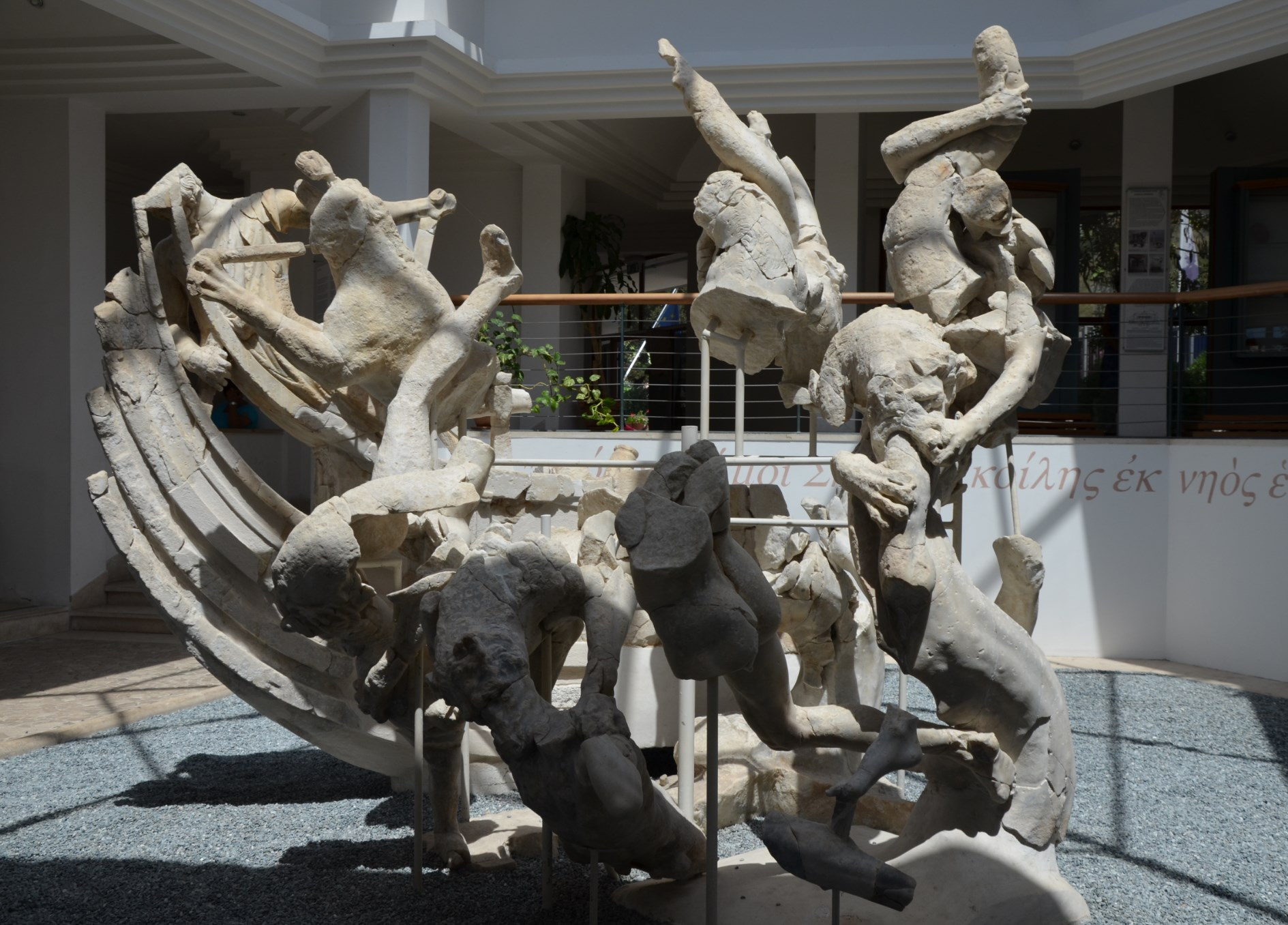
The "Scylla group" of the Sperlonga sculptures. The signatures are carved on the ship's prow.

In 1959 a very large set of sculptures were discovered at Sperlonga, and are now in a museum there created for them. One section, the ship's prow of the "Scylla group", was signed by the same three names, this time with the names of their fathers, but in a different order. Sperlonga is the classical Spelunca mentioned by Tacitus and others, on the coast between Rome and Naples, where the emperor Tiberius had a celebrated villa. Tiberius was nearly killed when the grotto containing the statues collapsed in 26 AD, as Tacitus recounts, so they must predate this. The sculptures were in thousands of fragments, and reconstruction of the smaller pieces continues, amid much scholarly argument. The scenes all feature stories of Odysseus, and are in a similar style to the Laocoön, but with many significant differences, not least in quality, being uneven but generally of much lower skill and finish (the group is also considerably larger). Both the Sperlonga works and the Laocoön were probably created in Italy for very wealthy Roman patrons very likely from the Imperial circle; they were certainly owned by the Imperial family later, as Pliny says the Laocoön belonged to the Emperor Titus in his day.

== Inscriptions ==
Agesander is named first by Pliny as artist of the Laocoön, with Athenodoros second, but in the "signature" inscription at Sperlonga his name comes second to Athenodoros, who is "Athenodoros, son of Agesander". The others are "Agesandros, son of Paionios" (Paionios is a rare name) and "Polydoros, son of Polydoros". It is thought that strict seniority governed the sequence of names in such cases and, barring a simple mistake by Pliny, that it cannot be the same Agesander in both Pliny and Sperlonga. It was common for Rhodians to be named after their grandfathers, with the same names alternating over many generations for as long as several centuries. An inscription on a base for a statue at Lindos, firmly dated to 42 BC, records "Athenodorus, son of Agesander", but again it is unclear how these two names relate to the other references – in fact both names were very common on Rhodes, though infrequent elsewhere. Conversely Polydorus, the last named in both inscriptions, is generally a common Greek name, but much less so on Rhodes, and as a sculptor seems only known from Pliny, whereas an Athenodorus was evidently famous, recorded on several bases for sculptures (all found or recorded detached from their sculptures), more as a label or caption than a signature. In some he is again "Athenodorus, son of Agesander". This is also the name of a priest recorded in an inscription at Lindos datable to 22 BC, which also records a possible brother "Agesander, son of Agesander"; either of these might have been sculptors also, or not.

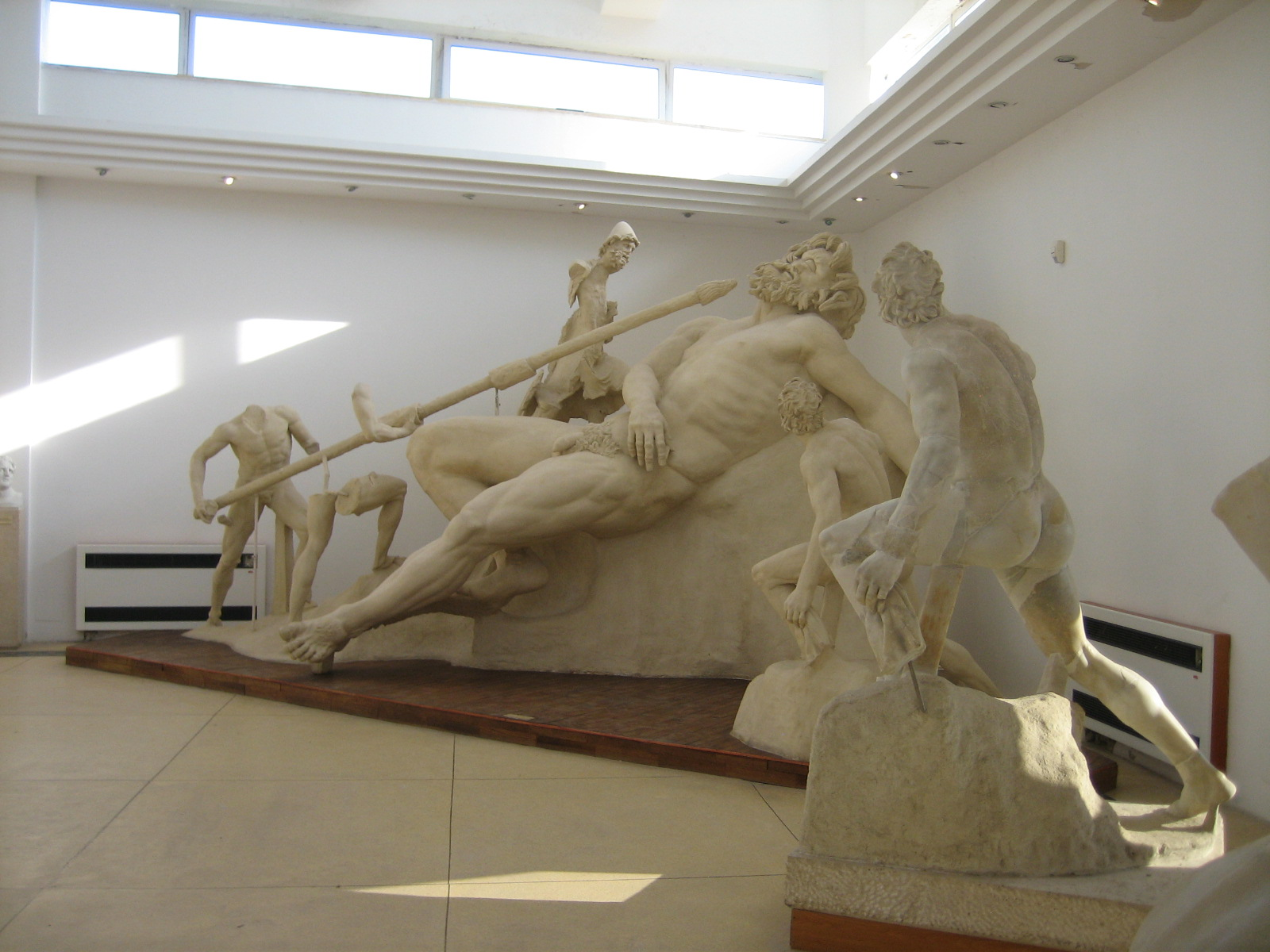
The central group of the Sperlonga sculptures, with the Blinding of Polyphemus

"Agesandros, son of Paionios" occurs in other honorific inscriptions, including a very grand one on Rhodes listing over twenty related individuals, and Paionios's own father is another Agesander. E. E. Rice says this inscription can be dated fairly closely to "c. 60–50 BC, probably closer to 50 BC", and identifies Agesandros with the Sperlonga sculptor. As an example of the proliferation of these names, another "Agesander, son of Agesander, son of Athenodorus" is recorded as a military man on Rhodes, and was probably born about 120 BC, but there is no evidence to connect him with sculpting.

One possibility is that either or both of the trios containing Agesander possessed the same names as sculptors from an earlier period, perhaps as members of the same family or workshop tradition.

Controversy over the general date of Agesander's life, or the lives of various Agesanders, has never been settled; it was previously discussed on the grounds of artistic style, but now the evidence of inscriptions has come into play. The 18th-century art historian Johann Joachim Winckelmann felt certain that, as sculptor of the Laocoön group, he was a contemporary of Lysippos in the 4th century BC; others have placed him as late as the 70s AD, in the reign of Vespasian. The death of Pliny in the eruption that destroyed Pompeii in 79 AD provides a terminus ante quem for the Laocoön, just as the collapsing grotto at Sperlonga in 26 AD does for those works. Modern scholarly consensus puts the likely time frame for these works as between 50 BC and 70 AD, though lively controversy continues as to more precise dating: a French article of 1997 was called "Un conflit qui s'éternise: La guerre de Sperlonga", or "A conflict which is becoming endless: the War of Sperlonga".

Rice makes the confident and convenient but perhaps unwarranted assumption that only one Athenodoros, the son of Agesander, practiced as a sculptor, and that he signed the Lindos statue in 42 BC, a prestigious commission not likely to be given to a young artist. Reconstructing his proposed and putative career as a famous sculptor, Athenodoros flourished up to perhaps about 10 BC, working in Italy for perhaps most of the latter part of his career. Some time before about 10 BC he was first the second sculptor of the Laocoön, probably under his father Agesandros, and at a later date was the lead sculptor of Sperlonga. He was probably also related to the Sperlonga Agesander, son of Paionios, although this Agesander was not his father, and Rice does not speculate how the Sperlonga Agesander (the second name listed on the inscription there) might fit in.
