= Paolo Antonio Soderini =

Florentine jurist

Paolo Antonio Soderini (1448 — after 1500) was a noble Florentine jurist active in the anti-Medicean Florentine republic, who spent some years resident at Rome.

He was the older brother of the statesman Piero Soderini, who was exiled at the return of the Medici in 1512; a third brother was Cardinal Francesco Soderini, bishop of Volterra. Like Piero he had been a pupil of Marsilio Ficino at his informal "academy", patronized by the Medici, but when Piero di Lorenzo de' Medici fled from Florence in 1494, he declared at once in favour of the revived Florentine republic and served as Florentine Ambassador to Venice. Philippe de Commines, unsympathetic to his policy, declared him, nevertheless, "one of the wisest statesmen in all Italy". On his return he was elected gonfaloniere of justice in 1497. The institution of a Grand Council in republican Florence, on the Venetian model, was largely on his initiative. As republican supporters of Savonarola and the populist party, he shared his brother's exile when the radical friar was arrested.

In Rome he established himself in a house and garden close to Castel Sant'Angelo, where he undertook some informal excavations and assembled a notable collection of antiquities, including Roman sculpture (including the Menelaus supporting the body of Patroclus that passed from his heir to the Medici and can be seen today in Loggia dei Lanzi, Florence) and inscriptions.
