= Laocoön =

Trojan priest in Greek and Roman mythology

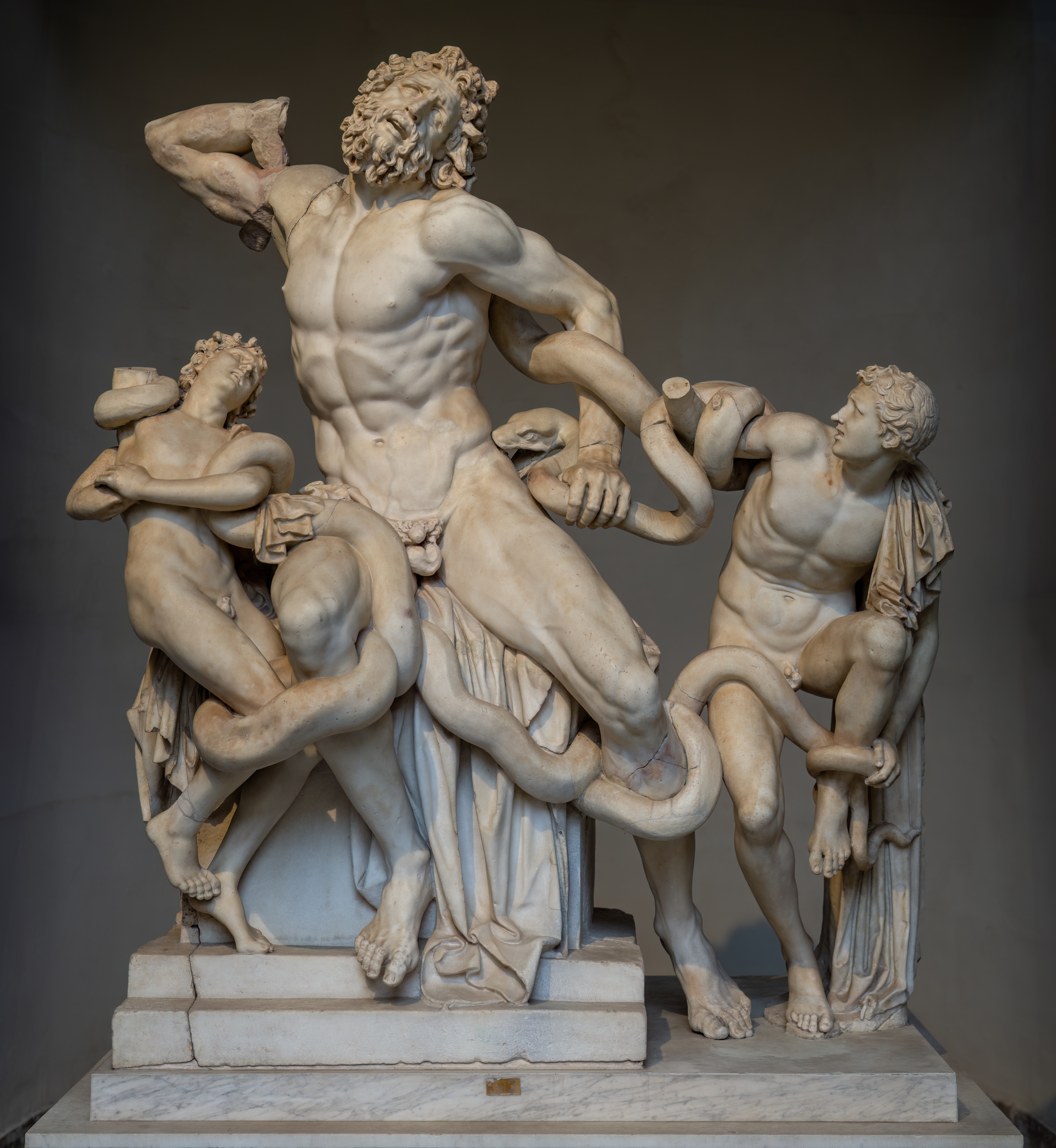
Laocoön and His Sons in the Vatican

Laocoön (Note: The double-dot diacritic over the second "o" is a diaeresis, indicating that each vowel sounds as a separate syllable.) (/leɪˈɒkoʊˌɒn, -kəˌwɒn/; Ancient Greek: Λᾱοκόων, romanized: Lāokóōn) was a Trojan priest in Greek and Roman mythology. He is first attested in the 7th-century BC epic Iliupersis by Arctinus of Miletus, part of the Epic Cycle.

In ancient tradition, Laocoön served as a priest of either Apollo Thymbraeus or Poseidon. Accounts of his transgressions and death vary considerably. In early Greek sources, he was punished by Apollo for breaking a vow of celibacy or fathering children in the god's sanctuary, with serpents killing his sons or both him and one son. In the better-known Roman tradition developed in Virgil's Aeneid, Laocoön was killed after warning the Trojans against the Trojan Horse and striking it with a spear, whereupon two sea serpents crushed him and both of his sons.

The myth was dramatized in Sophocles' lost tragedy Laocoön and inspired the Hellenistic marble sculpture Laocoön and His Sons, excavated in Rome in 1506. The statue became a focal point of 18th-century European aesthetic theory, notably in the work of Gotthold Ephraim Lessing.

== Etymology and genealogy ==
The name Laocoön (genitive Λᾱοκόωντος) derives from λαός (laós, "people" or "warriors") and κοέειν (koéein, "to hear" or "to perceive"), meaning "he who heeds the people". The grammarian Priscian noted an archaic inscription on a tripod of Apollo in Constantinople preserving the form ΛΑϜΟΚΟϜΩΝ (Lāwokowōn).

Ancient sources variously identify Laocoön's father as Capys, Acoetes, or Antenor. As a son of Capys or Acoetes, he was a brother of Anchises and the uncle of Aeneas, linking him to the Trojan royal dynasty. According to Hyginus, Apollo had forbidden Laocoön to marry and have children, but he defied the god and married; Servius, citing Euphorion of Chalcis, gives his wife's name as Antiope. Authors disagreed on the names of the two sons resulting from the union; Hyginus identified them as Antiphas (or Antiphates) and Thymbraeus, whereas Servius, citing an otherwise unknown writer named Thessandrus, gave their names as Ethron (or Aethion) and Melanthus.

Laocoön's priesthood is similarly divided between Apollo Thymbraeus and Poseidon. In the commentary of Servius on Virgil, drawing on Euphorion of Chalcis, the Trojans had previously stoned their regular priest of Poseidon for failing to avert the Greek landing. After the apparent departure of the Greek fleet, the Trojans drew lots for a priest to sacrifice to Poseidon to bring storms upon the returning Greeks, and the lot fell on Laocoön.

== Mythological accounts ==
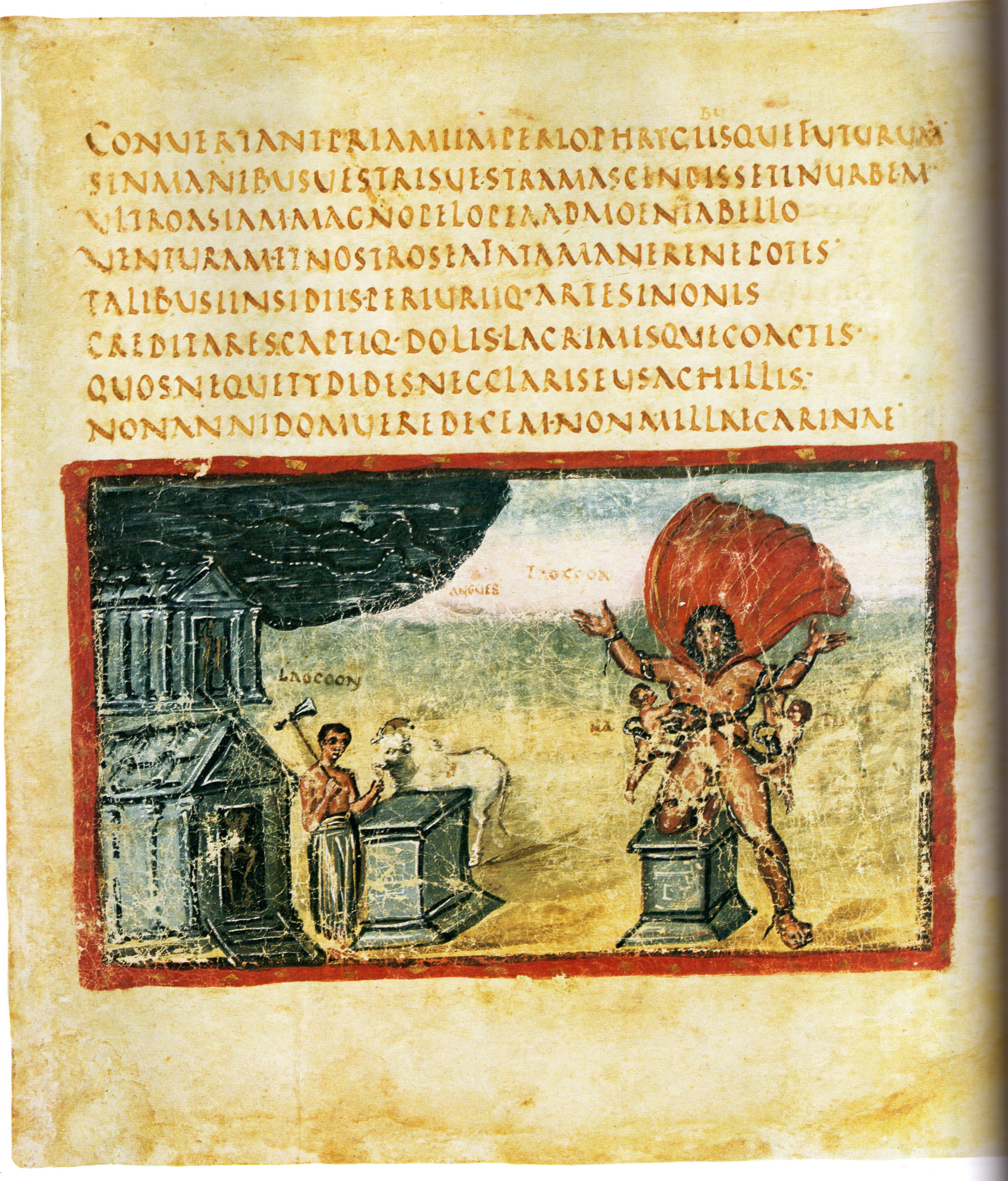
Death of Laocoön and his sons in the 5th-century Vatican Vergil (Folio 18v)

=== Early Greek versions ===
The earliest surviving account of Laocoön's death appears in the summary of Arctinus of Miletus' lost epic Iliupersis (7th century BC), preserved in the Chrestomathy attributed to Proclus. When the Trojans debated whether to dedicate the wooden horse to Athena or push it from a cliff, two serpents emerged from the sea during the ensuing celebration and killed Laocoön and one of his two sons. Interpreting the event as a dire omen, Aeneas gathered his household and fled the city for Mount Ida.

In the 5th century BC, Bacchylides treated the myth in a dithyramb, writing that serpents swam from the Calydna islands to attack Laocoön and his wife. Sophocles wrote a tragedy titled Laocoön, of which only five textual fragments, an isolated gloss, and an indirect reference survive. In modern reconstructions of the play, the serpents killed both sons while the father survived to mourn. This omen prompted Anchises to advise Aeneas to withdraw before the fall of Troy, unlike in Arctinus' epic where Laocoön himself was killed.

Hellenistic poets preserved alternative motives for the divine punishment. According to Euphorion of Chalcis (3rd century BC), Laocoön was punished for having intercourse with Antiope inside the sanctuary of Apollo, directly in front of the cult statue; when later chosen by lot to sacrifice to Poseidon, serpents killed him and his sons. A fragment from the Oxyrhynchus Papyri (P.Oxy. 2812), attributed to Nicander of Colophon (2nd century BC), names the two sea serpents Porkes and Chariboia. In this account, Apollo sent them from the Calydna islands across the sea, where they devoured one of Laocoön's sons over an altar.

=== Virgil's Aeneid ===
The standard account in Western literature was established by Virgil in Book 2 of the Aeneid (late 1st century BC), which first linked Laocoön's fate directly to his opposition to the Trojan Horse. Descending from the citadel, Laocoön warns the citizens against Greek deception:

"Equo ne credite, Teucri / Quidquid id est, timeo Danaos et dona ferentis"
("Do not trust the Horse, Trojans / Whatever it is, I fear the Greeks even when bearing gifts.")

He then hurls his spear into the wooden flank of the horse, causing it to reverberate.

Soon after, the Greek captive Sinon convinces the Trojans that the horse is an offering to Minerva. While Laocoön is sacrificing a bull to Neptune at an altar on the shore, two immense serpents swim across the sea from Tenedos. The serpents first attack and constrict his two sons. When Laocoön attempts to rescue them with weapons in hand, the serpents bind him around the waist and neck, biting and strangling him:

from the Aeneid (2.220–224)
Ille simul manibus tendit divellere nodos

perfusus sanie vittas atroque veneno,
clamores simul horrendos ad sidera tollit:
qualis mugitus, fugit cum saucius aram

taurus et incertam excussit cervice securim.

Literal prose translation
With his hands he strains to tear open the knots,

his fillets drenched with gore and black venom;
at the same time he raises dreadful cries to the stars:
like the bellowing of a bull that flees wounded

from the altar, shaking off the ill-aimed axe from its neck.

tr. Dryden (1697)
With both his hands he labors at the knots;

His holy fillets the blue venom blots;
His roaring fills the flitting air around.
Thus, when an ox receives a glancing wound,
He breaks his bands, the fatal altar flies,

And with loud bellowings breaks the yielding skies.

The serpents glide into the citadel and seek shelter beneath the feet and shield of Minerva's statue at the temple of Tritonis. The Trojans interpret Laocoön's death as retribution for violating the sacred offering, leading them to bring the horse into the city walls.

=== Imperial and late antique accounts ===
In the 1st century AD, Petronius reworked the Virgilian episode in chapter 89 of the Satyricon, where the poet Eumolpus recites an iambic poem on the sack of Troy. In this version, Laocoön attacks the horse with a spear and then an axe, shaking its structure. Later, two sea serpents from Tenedos kill his twin sons and drag Laocoön down between the altars, slaughtering him like an animal.

The mythographer Pseudo-Apollodorus wrote that after the horse was wheeled inside the city, both Laocoön and Cassandra warned the Trojans. Apollo sent two sea serpents that devoured Laocoön's sons, though the text leaves the father's fate unmentioned. In Book 12 of the Posthomerica, Quintus Smyrnaeus recorded that Athena struck Laocoön blind with earthquakes when he urged the Trojans to burn the horse. When he continued to urge destruction of the horse, Athena sent two serpents from the Calydna islands to devour his sons, leaving Laocoön alive to weep with his wife before an empty cenotaph.

In late antiquity, the anonymous Excidium Troiae noted that the Trojans demanded Laocoön offer a sacrifice to Neptune to confirm his accusations against the horse, during which the serpents arrived from Tenedos and killed him alongside his children. In the North African Latin poetry of the Codex Salmasianus (carmen 99 of the Anthologia Latina), an epigram framed the death of Laocoön and his sons as divine retaliation for damaging the horse. In his late 5th-century epyllion De raptu Helenae, the poet Blossius Aemilius Dracontius adapted Virgil's portrayal of Laocoön to shape the prophetic Trojan priest Helenus, who similarly warns his countrymen in vain against impending catastrophe.

== Ancient art ==
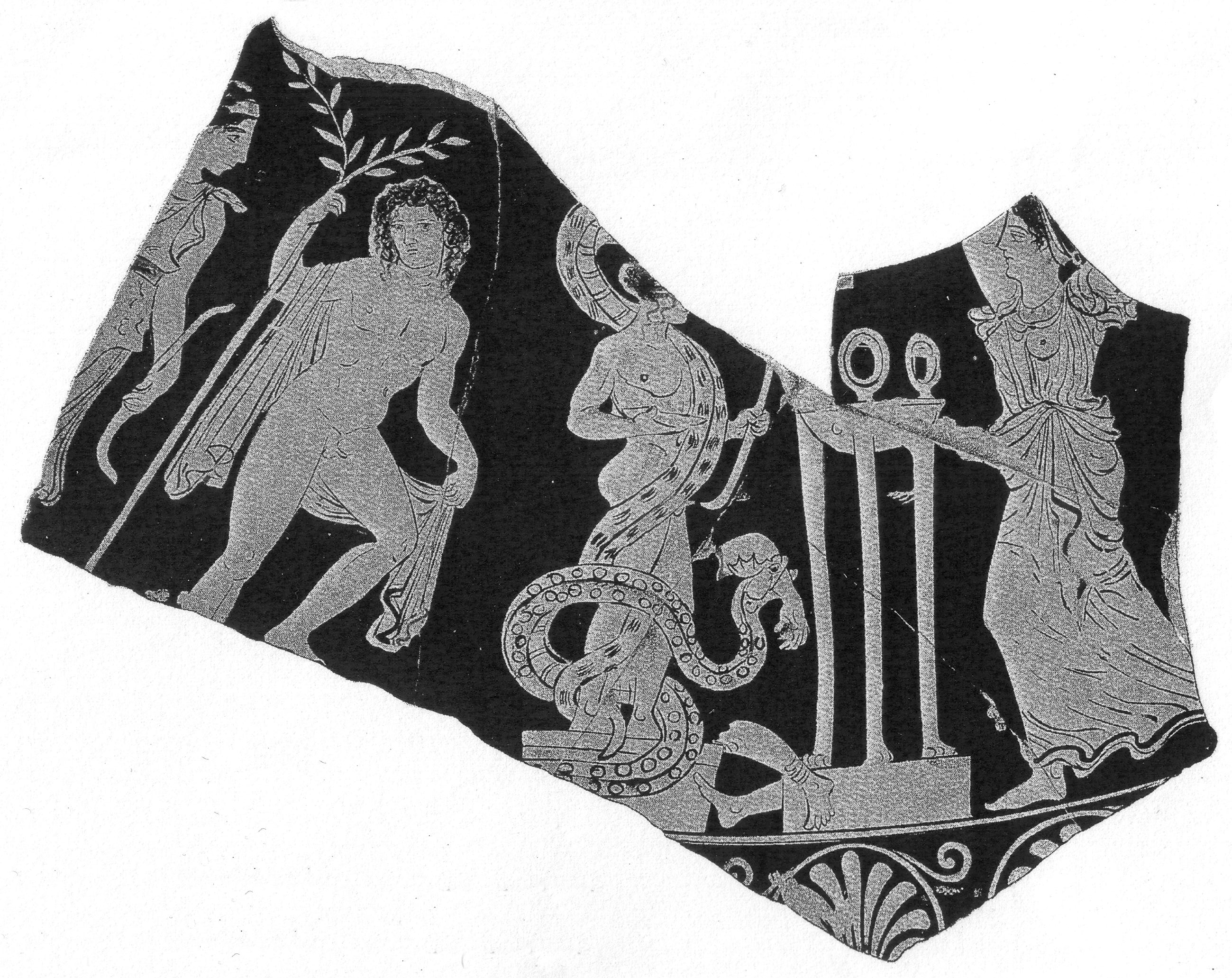
Fragment of an Apulian krater (c. 380–370 BC), Jatta National Archaeological Museum, Ruvo di Puglia

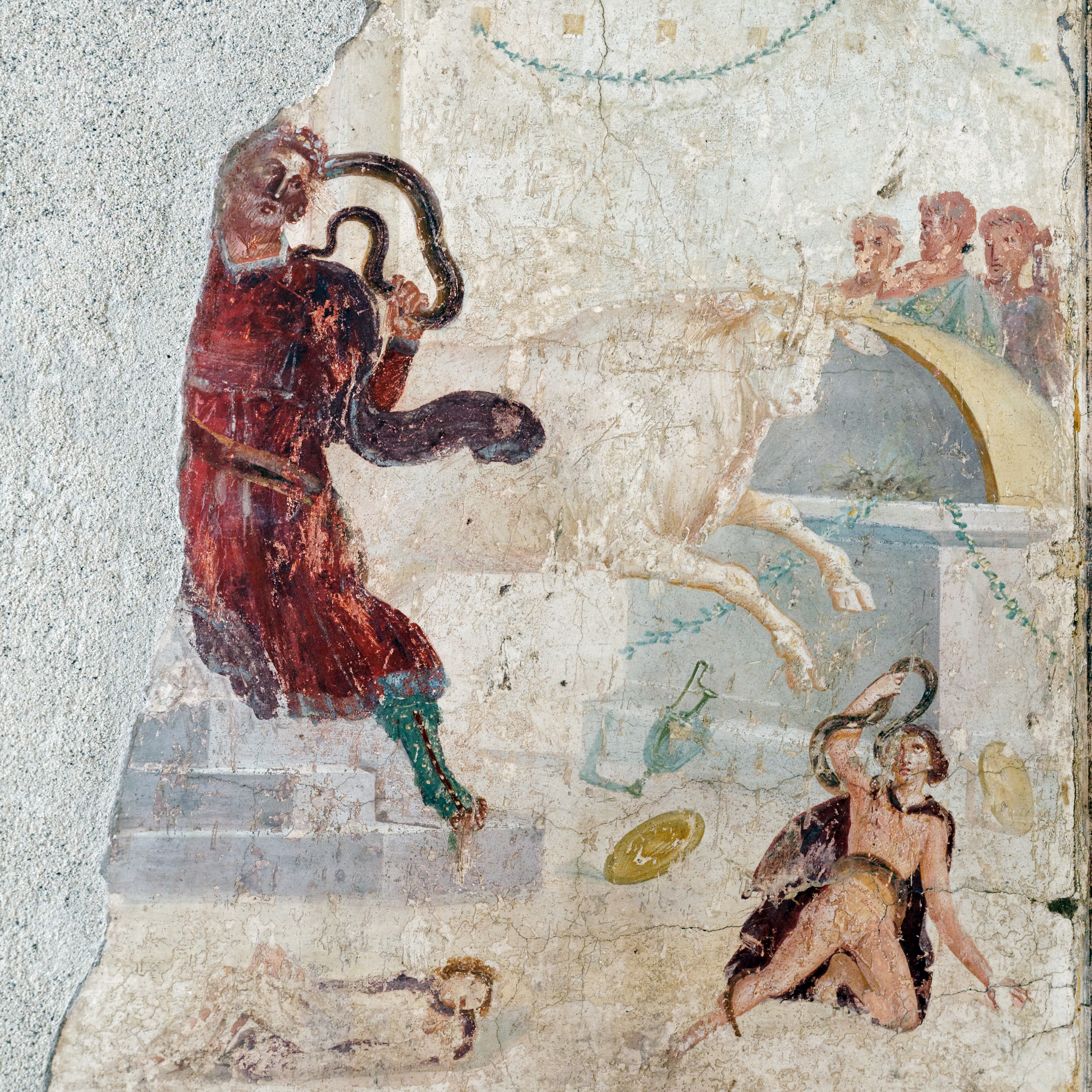
Roman fresco of the death of Laocoön from the Casa di Laocoonte in Pompeii (mid-1st century AD), Naples National Archaeological Museum

The earliest surviving visual representations of the myth appear on South Italian pottery and predate Virgil. A Lucanian red-figure bell-krater by the Pisticci Painter (c. 430–425 BC), preserved in the Antikenmuseum Basel, shows a woman with an axe, identified as Antiope, and a bearded man near an altar and a serpent-draped statue of Apollo, with the remains of a child. Similarly, fragments of an Apulian krater in the Jatta National Archaeological Museum at Ruvo di Puglia (c. 380–370 BC) depict Apollo, Artemis, and a cult statue bound by serpents with the dismembered body of a child, reflecting early Greek traditions set in Apollo's sanctuary rather than on the seashore.

Two prominent Roman wall paintings from the mid-1st century AD were discovered in Pompeii. In the Casa di Laocoonte, a Fourth Style fresco portrays Laocoön in a chiton and wreath collapsing onto the steps of an altar while being constricted by a serpent; one son is trapped in coils and the other lies dead on the ground, with spectators and a sacrificial bull in the background. In the House of Menander, another fresco shows Laocoön and one son attacked near a table while a second son lies dead, placed symmetrically opposite a painting of Cassandra.

=== The Vatican sculpture ===
On 14 January 1506, a monumental marble statue group was unearthed in the vineyard of Felice de Fredis on the Oppian Hill near the church of San Pietro in Vincoli in Rome. The architect Giuliano da Sangallo and Michelangelo identified it with the sculpture praised by Pliny the Elder in his Naturalis Historia (36.37) as standing in the palace of Emperor Titus, attributed to the Rhodian sculptors Agesander, Athenodoros, and Polydorus. Acquired by Pope Julius II, the work was placed in the Belvedere Courtyard of the Vatican Museums.

Art historians debate whether the group is an original Hellenistic bronze work copied in marble in the late 1st century BC or an Imperial Roman creation of the 1st century AD. In the composition, the older son on the viewer's right appears capable of freeing himself from the serpents, which classical scholars such as Erika Simon correlate with the pre-Virgilian narrative of Arctinus where one son survives. The sculpture was originally displayed with an outstretched right arm added in Renaissance restorations. In 1905, archaeologist Ludwig Pollak discovered the original bent right arm in a Roman workshop, which was reattached to the statue by Vatican conservators in 1960.

== Later reception ==
Laocoön by El Greco, c. 1610–1614, National Gallery of Art, Washington, D.C.

During the Renaissance, the discovery of the statue group prompted renewed literary and artistic interest. Jacopo Sadoleto composed the Latin poem De Laocoontis statua in 1506, utilizing Virgilian phrasing, while Marco Dente produced an influential engraving in 1510 linking the sculpture to Book 2 of the Aeneid. Titian designed a caricature, engraved by Boldrini, depicting Laocoön and his sons as apes, mocking the Renaissance fixation on antiquity and satirizing Baccio Bandinelli's marble copy. Between 1610 and 1614, El Greco completed his oil painting Laocoön, setting the figures against the view of Toledo, Spain. In 20th-century sculpture, Alexander Calder created the stabile Laocoön (1947), and postminimalist artist Eva Hesse produced her freestanding sculptural framework Laocoon (1966).

In 1766, Gotthold Ephraim Lessing published his aesthetic treatise Laokoon: An Essay on the Limits of Painting and Poetry. Lessing argued that visual art is bound to spatial representation and restraint of expression, whereas poetry operates in time and allows for raw emotional intensity, contrasting the stoic agony of the Vatican marble with the screams of Virgil's priest. Lessing's analysis stimulated responses from Johann Wolfgang von Goethe and Friedrich Schiller.

Allusions to the myth appear throughout modern literature. In Charles Dickens' A Christmas Carol (1843), Ebenezer Scrooge awakes on Christmas morning and struggles to dress, "making a perfect Laocoön of himself with his stockings." Further references to Laocoön occur in Sinclair Lewis's Arrowsmith, John Steinbeck's East of Eden, John Barth's The End of the Road, and Vladimir Nabokov's Bend Sinister.

In music, Pietro Alessandro Guglielmi set the story in his opera seria Laconte (or Laocoonte) in 1787. In Hector Berlioz's opera Les Troyens (composed 1856–1858), Aeneas enters with a messenger speech recounting Laocoön's death; this is followed by the octet and double chorus "Châtiment effroyable", which prompts the Trojans to haul the wooden horse into the city.

== Namesakes ==
- 3240 Laocoon, a Jovian Trojan asteroid discovered in 1978.

== See also ==
- Sperlonga sculptures
- Pergamon Altar
- Cetus (mythology)
- Cassandra complex
