= 334th All-Weather Squadron =

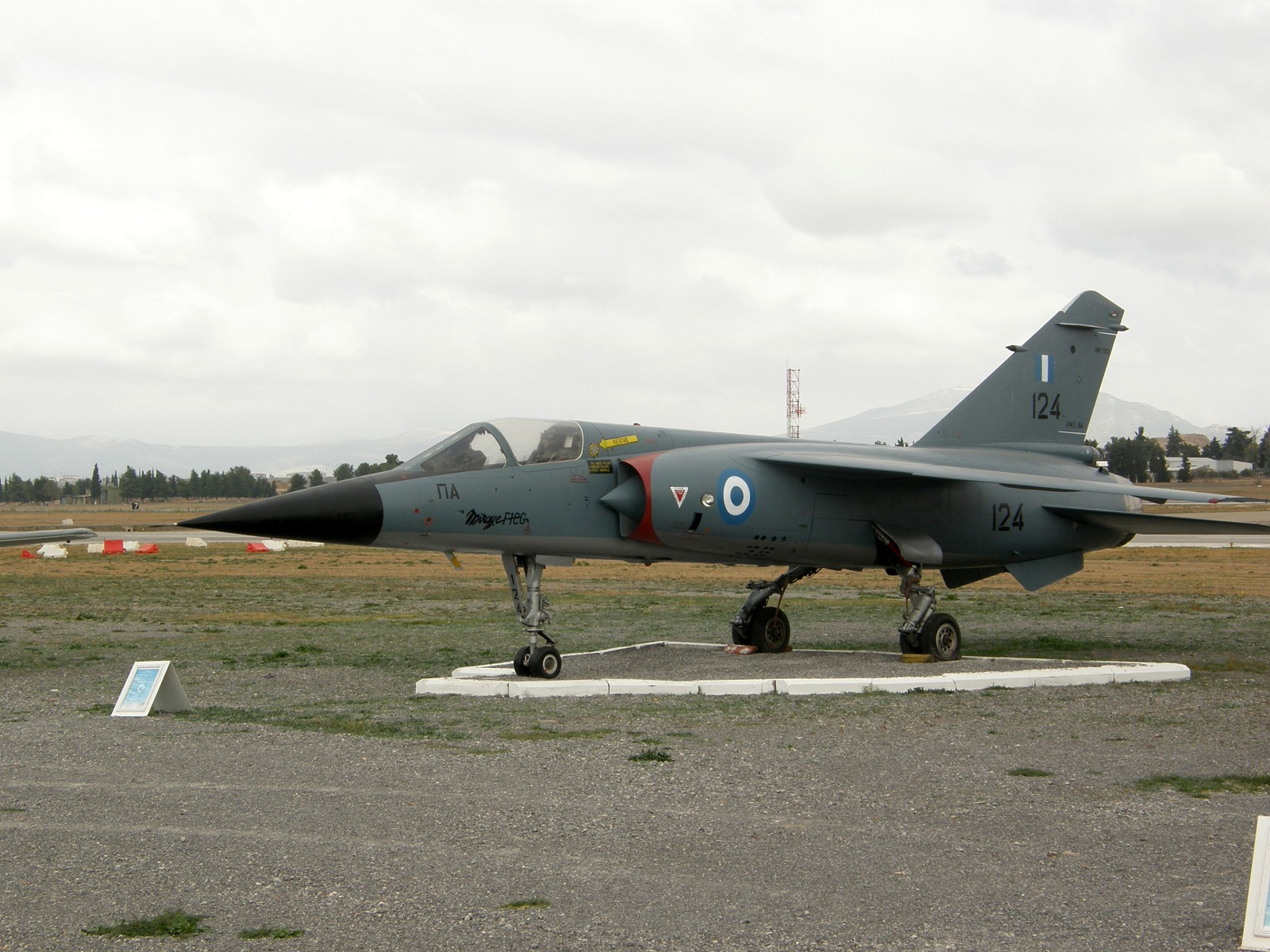
- Mirage F1CG with on display at 114th Combat Wing, 2008
- Active: 1977–2000
- Branch: Hellenic Air Force
- Part of: 114th Combat Wing (1977–1989), 126th Combat Group (1989–2000)
- Garrison/HQ: Heraklion Air Base

Aircraft flown
- Fighter: Mirage F1CG (1977–2000)

The 334th All-Weather Squadron (Greek: 334 Μοίρα Παντός Καιρού, 334 MΠΚ), callsign "Talos" (ΤΑΛΩΣ), was a squadron in service with the Hellenic Air Force from 1977 to 2000.

== History ==
The squadron was established in 1977 as at the 114th Combat Wing, equipped with the Mirage F1CG aircraft.

In July 1989 the squadron moved to Heraklion Air Base and the 126th Combat Group, where it remained until its disbandment in 2000.
