= Talos =

Automaton in Greek mythology

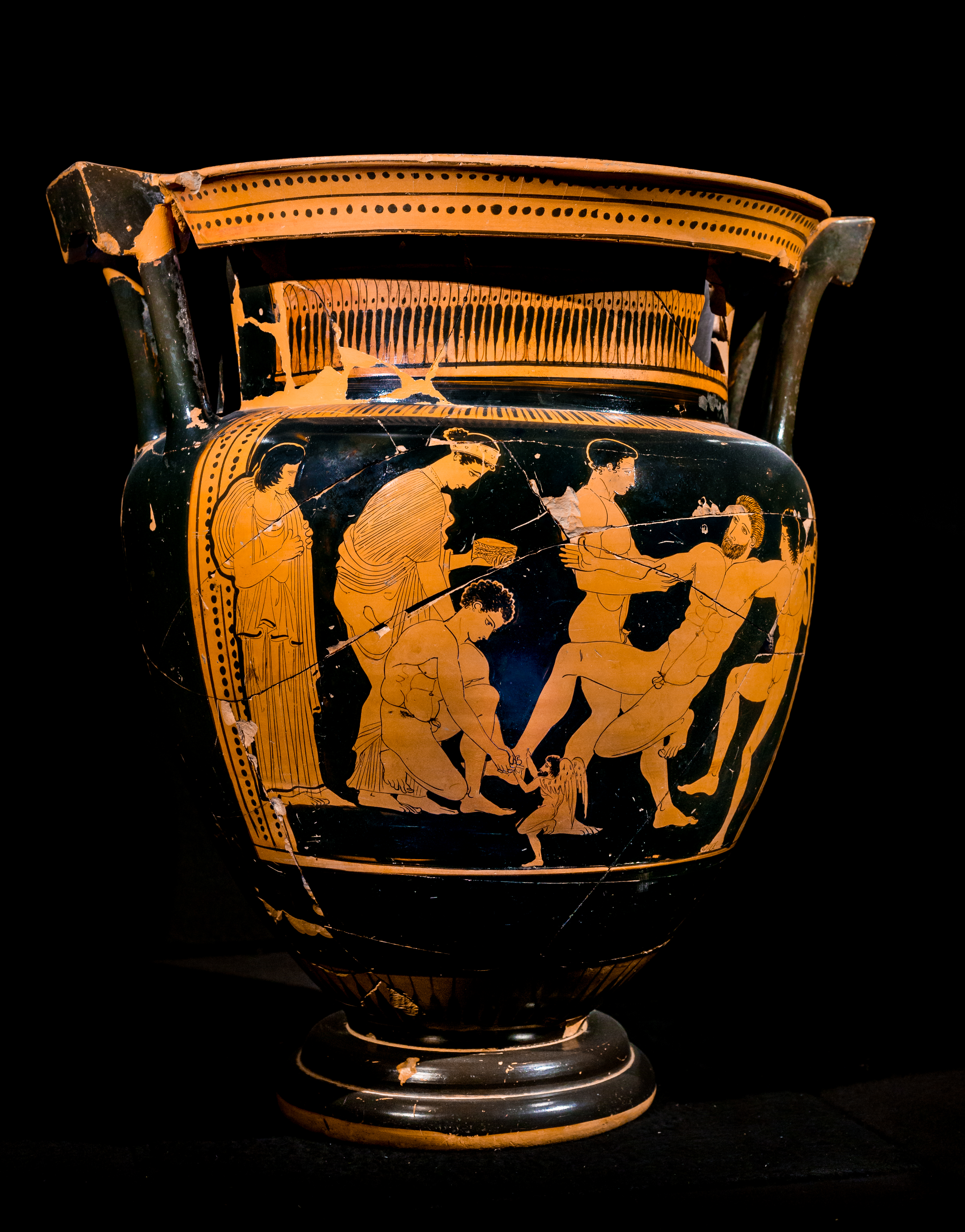
The Death of Talos depicted on a column krater (Museo Archeologico Nazionale del Sannio Caudino, Montesarchio)

In Greek mythology, Talos, also spelled Talus (/ˈteɪlɒs/; Greek: Τάλως, Tálōs) or Talon (/ˈteɪlɒn, ən/; Greek: Τάλων, Tálōn), was a man of bronze who protected Crete from pirates and invaders. Despite the popular idea that he was a giant, no ancient source states this explicitly.

== Narrative ==
Different literary sources provide a wide variety of accounts of Talos's role and genealogy. The most popular variant of the myth of Talos is that found in the Argonautica of Apollonius of Rhodes (fl. first half of 3rd century BCE). In this account, Talos is described as being a descendant of the bronze race (χαλκοῦ γένους) who sprang from ash-trees. He is described as being bronze and also invulnerable with the exception of a vein in his ankle which was protected by only a thin layer of skin.

He was given to Europa by Zeus in order to protect Crete, which he does by running around the island three times. The Argonauts encounter him on their return voyage after obtaining the Golden Fleece. As the Argo approached Crete, Talos kept them at bay by hurling great boulders at the ship. Medea then declares that only she will be able to defeat Talos, which she does by performing a feat of magic from the Argo. Summoning the keres (female death-spirits), Medea causes Talos to graze his ankle, leading to the ichor draining from his body, and thus killing him. In describing his death Apollonius employs a metaphor comparing Talos to a 'monstrous pine tree' (πελωρίη πεύκη, pelōriē peukē) being felled, which could be taken to imply a larger-than-human size.

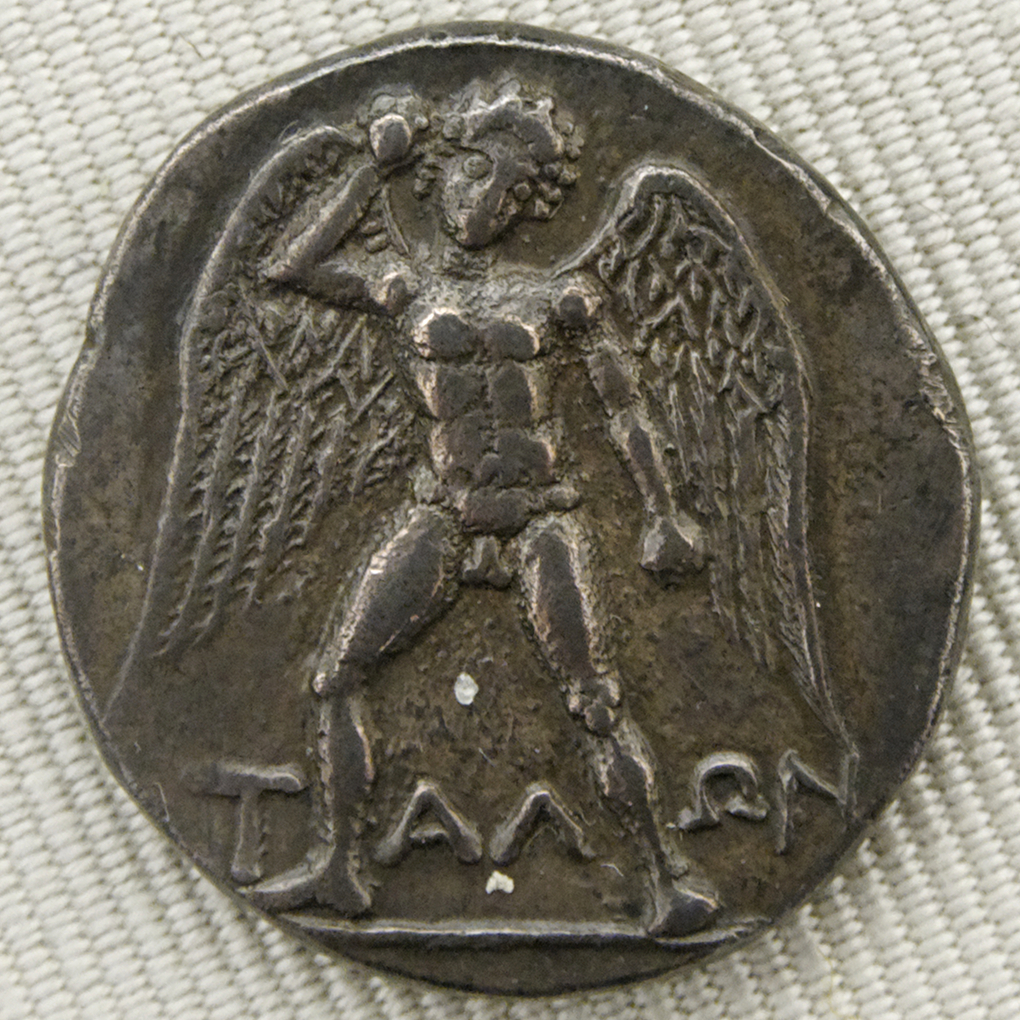
Winged "ΤΑΛΩΝ" armed with a stone. Obverse of silver didrachma from Phaistos, Crete (c. 300/280–270 BC) (Cabinet des Médailles, Paris).

Pseudo-Apollodorus collected several traditions regarding the origin, form, and death of Talos. In relation to his origin, two theories are given: either he belonged to the Race of Bronze, or he had been given to Minos by Hephaestus (no reason is given). Another two theories are provided regarding his form: he was either a bull or a bronze man. Pseudo-Apollodorus further states that Talos guarded Crete by running around the island three times daily and that he had a single vein running from his neck to his ankles, which was stopped with a bronze nail at the end.

Pseudo-Apollodorus also gives three variants regarding his death. The first two are at the hands of Medea: either she drove him mad with drugs, or, promising him immortality, she pulled the nail from his ankle, which caused the ichor to flow out. The final variant is that he was killed by the Argonaut Poeas, who shot an arrow into his ankle.

== Artistic sources ==
Artistic sources linking Talos with the Argonauts significantly predate the account of Apollonius. On three kraters from around 400 BCE, his death at the hands of the Argonauts is depicted. One red-figure vase, now in the Jatta National Archaeological Museum, is the name vase of the Talos Painter. It shows Talos falling backwards, into the arms of the Dioskouroi. In order to distinguish his form from that of the other figures on the vase, Talos is painted in white, with details painted in brown and yellow. To the left stands Medea, holding a bowl, and looking across at Talos. Behind her is the Argo, with two more seated figures, inscribed as Zetes and Calais, whilst a third, unnamed figure, disembarks. To the right, the seated figures of Poseidon and Amphitrite look on. Below them a woman, identified by some as a representation of Crete, and by others as Europa, is shown fleeing from the scene.

Another vase, from Caudium (modern Montesarchio), has been identified as depicting the death of Talos. A bearded Talos, slightly larger than the other figures, falls to the right, into the arms of the Dioskouroi. An unnamed youth kneels to the left, tightly holding an implement of some sort with which he is manipulating a small, circular object – potentially a nail – on Talos's ankle. A woman stands behind the youth, bending down towards him. One arm is obscured, but in the other she holds a bowl. Behind her stands another unnamed woman. Suggestions as to her identity include a representation of Crete as a nymph or an attendant of Medea's. A small, winged, and bearded figure hovers next to Talos's ankle, gesturing closely to the site with the circular object. This figure is probably Thanatos.

A third, fragmentary vase from Spina shows the same scene, with a very similar composition to the Motesarchio vase. Talos, whose head and feet have not been preserved, is depicted in white, and is falling backwards into the arms of two men, most probably the Dioskouroi. To his left a crouching female figure, mostly lost but labelled by an inscription as Medea, holds a blade in one hand and a box resting on her knee in the other. To the right of Talos's lower leg is a small, winged, male figure, stretching his arms as if gesturing to Talos's ankle. An unnamed female figure stands further to the right, but the head and torso are not preserved. The small figure and the unnamed female figure have sometimes been interpreted as Eros and Aphrodite but the winged figure is more probably Thanatos and the identification of Aphrodite is unlikely.

Talos also appears on three coins from Phaistos dated to the Classical and early Hellenistic periods. He is depicted as a naked winged figure in the act of throwing a stone; on one coin there is a hound between his legs. The wings have been interpreted by Richard Buxton as a visual representation of the speed which Talos would have to possess in order to rapidly circuit the island of Crete.

== Other variants ==
=== Immolation of victims ===
Discussing the origin of the phrase sardonios gelos (σαρδόνιος γέλως) – 'sardonic laugh' – both Photius in his Lexicon, and Zenobius in his Proverbs cite Simonides (c. 556–468 BCE) for a story which involves Talos. Photius's summary of the account by Simonides is that some Sardinans refused to take Talos to king Minos of Crete, in response to which Talos grabbed them and jumped into some flames whilst holding them tight, killing them. Zenobius's summary states that Talos lived in Sardinia before going to Crete, and killed many of the inhabitants without mentioning how or why. Not enough remains to establish whether Simonides associated Talos with the Argonauts.

Talos is also mentioned in two fragments relating to a lost Sophoclean drama, Daidalos, the plot of which is unknown. The fragments indicate that in this source, too, Talos killed his victims by burning them. Outside of Simonides and Sophocles, no other surviving source mentions this method of execution.

=== Cretan lineage ===
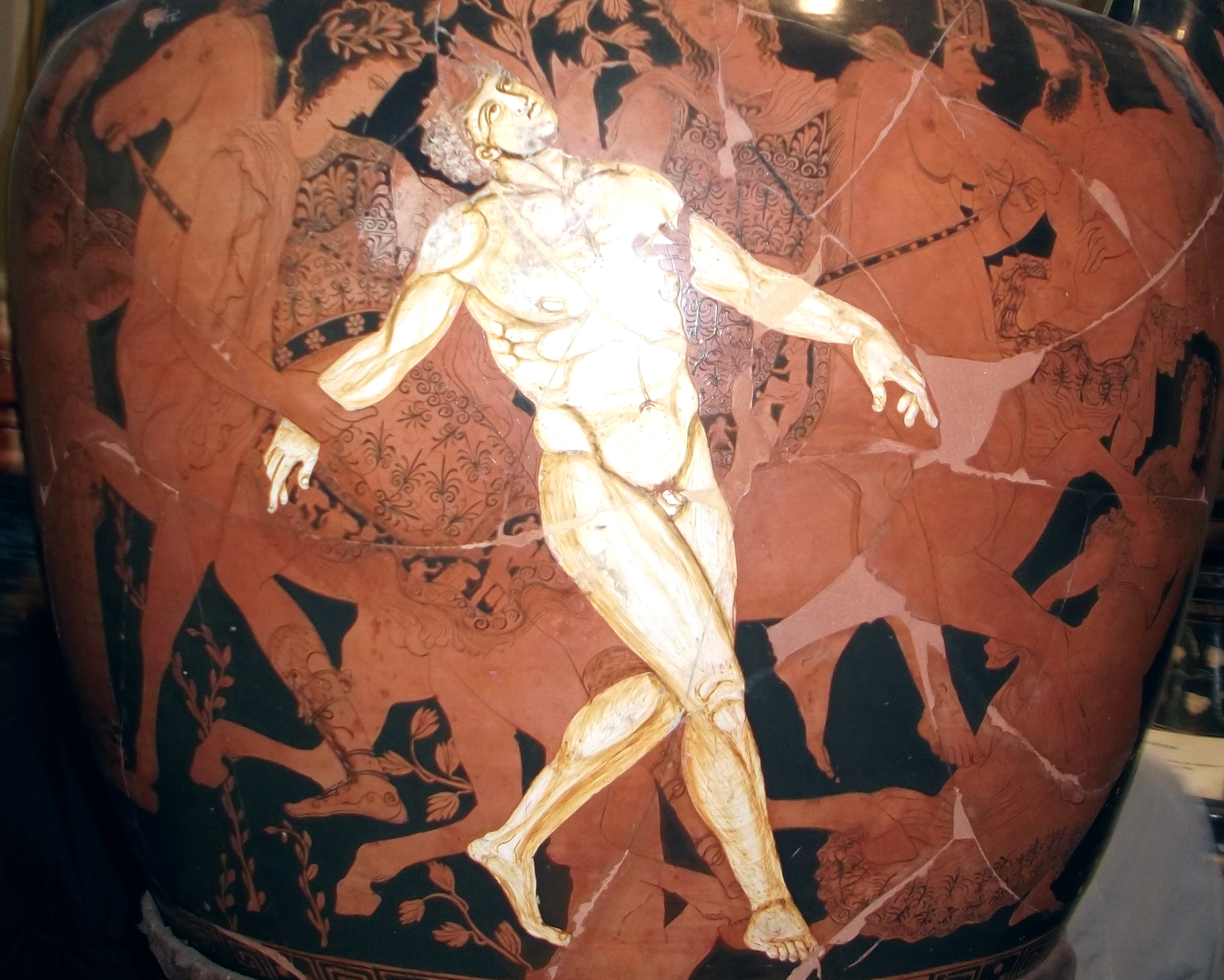
The death of Talos depicted on a Volute Krater circa 400 BCE (Jatta National Archaeological Museum in Ruvo di Puglia)

In a different tradition, Talos is the son of Cres, the personification of Crete. Hephaestus is his son, and Rhadamanthus – a mythical king of Crete – his grandson. This tradition is reported by Pausanias, who cites the poet Cinaethon of Sparta as his source. Pausanias states at another point that Talos was one of the sons of Oenopion, citing this to Ion of Chios. Pausanias gives no details of Talos outside of his genealogy.

According to Athenaeus, the lyric poet Ibycus wrote of Rhadamanthus as the lover of Talos, rather than grandson. The Suda, a Byzantine encyclopedia from the tenth-century CE, adds to this that Talos and Rhadamanthus introduced homosexuality to Crete.

=== Rationalisation ===
A euhemeristic interpretation of Talos is provided – along with many others – in the Minos, a dialogue which was attributed to Plato in antiquity, but which is regarded by most scholars today as being written by someone else. In this source, Talos is rationalised as a man who guards the laws of Crete by travelling around the villages of the island three times per year at the behest of Minos, in order to show the inhabitants the laws of the city, which were inscribed on tablets of bronze.

== See also ==
- Jason and the Argonauts – a 1963 movie in which Talos is depicted as a giant who is killed by Jason
- Talos No. 2 – an abstract bronze sculpture in Portland, Oregon
- The Talos Principle – a 2014 video game, the premise of which is that Talos is akin to a human being
- The Talos Dome in Antarctica, which is named after him
- 5786 Talos, an asteroid discovered in 1991 named after Talos
