= Laocoön (El Greco) =

Painting by El Greco

- Artist: El Greco
- Year: 1610–1614
- Type: Oil painting
- Dimensions: 142 cm × 193 cm (56 in × 76 in)
- Location: National Gallery of Art, Washington, D.C.

The Laocoön is an oil painting created between 1610 and 1614 by Greek painter El Greco. It is part of a collection at the National Gallery of Art in Washington, D.C.

The painting depicts the Greek and Roman mythological story of the deaths of Laocoön, a Trojan priest of Poseidon, and his two sons Antiphantes and Thymbraeus. Laocoön and his sons were strangled by sea serpents, a punishment sent by the gods after Laocoön attempted to warn his countrymen about the Trojan horse. Although inspired by the recently discovered monumental Hellenistic sculpture Laocoön and His Sons in Rome, Laocoön is a product of Mannerism, an artistic movement originating in Italy during the 16th century that countered the artistic ideals of the Renaissance. El Greco's painting deliberately breaks away from the balance and harmony of Renaissance art with its strong emotional atmosphere and distorted figures.

== Inspiration ==
El Greco's oil painting of Laocoön represents the influence of both classical mythology and artistry.

=== Classical Mythology ===
According to Greco-Roman mythology, Laocoön was a figure in the Trojan War waged between the Achaeans (Greeks) and Trojans. Laocoön's tale appears in many of the numerous classical texts concerning the Trojan War. In particular, Laocoön is a minor character in the Aeneid by Roman poet Virgil and the Epic Cycle, a distinct collection of Ancient Greek epic poems.

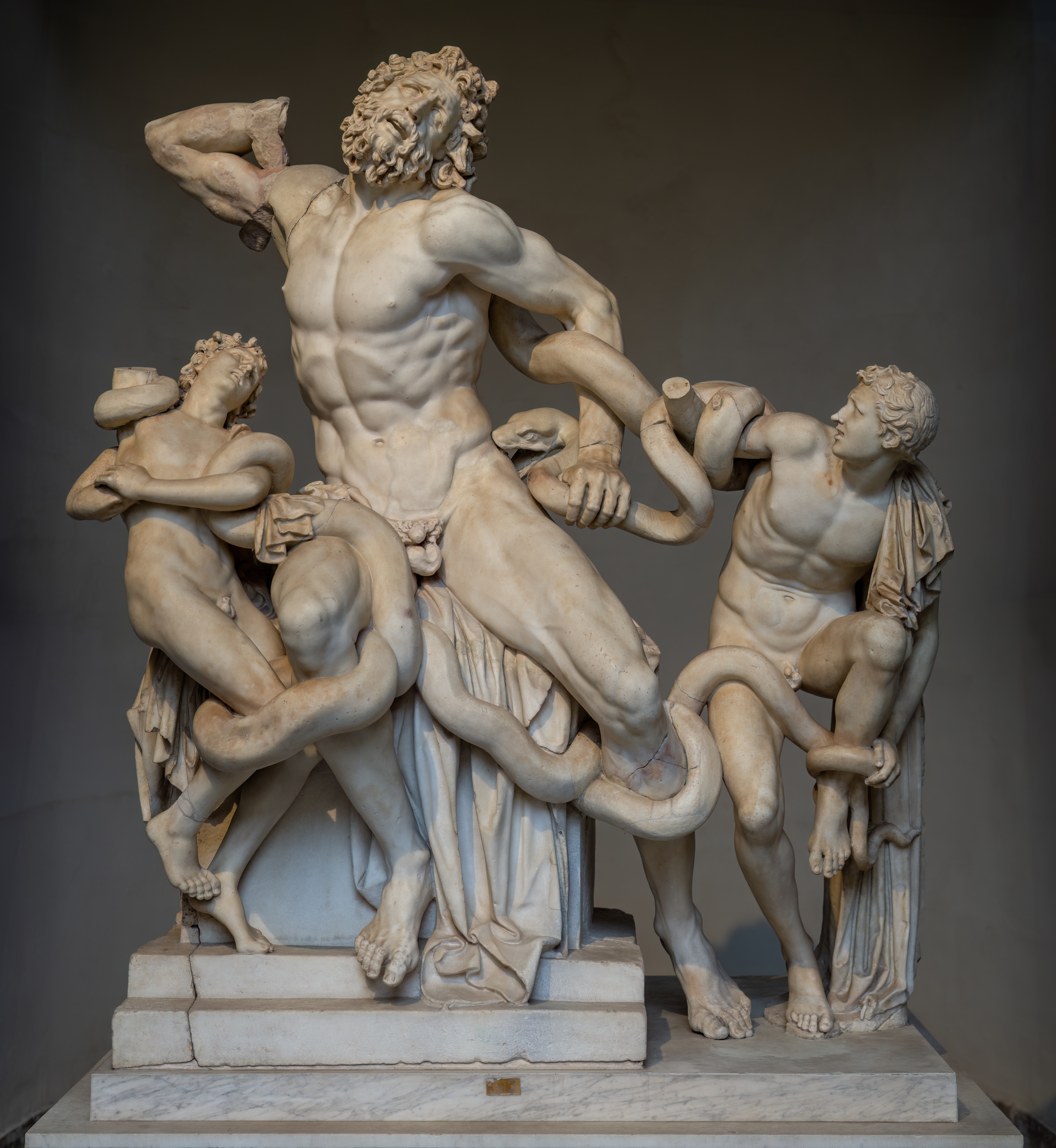
Attributed to: Agesander, Athenodoros and Polydorus, Laocoön and His Sons. The Classical Laocoon Group. Late Hellenistic), c. 160 BC and 20 BC, White marble, Vatican Museum

Laocoön became involved in the war after Greek soldiers, frustrated by their unsuccessful ten-year siege of the city, devised a ruse to end the war: the hollow Trojan Horse filled with Greek soldiers. Laocoön attempted to warn his compatriots that the horse was a "deadly fraud" instead of a gift, but the Trojans did not heed the warning. Believing that the war was over, the Trojans triumphantly brought the horse within their city walls and initiated a catastrophic series of events that brought about the sack of Troy.

=== Classical Sculpture ===
Laocoön was killed by divine execution from the gods, who supported the Greeks in the Trojan War and sent the sea serpents as punishment. Laocoön's death is the subject of a famous monumental Hellenistic sculpture, known as Laocoön and His Sons. The 1st-century BCE marble sculpture was created by Athenadoros, Agesander, and Polydoros of Rhodes. The Laocoön group captures a climactic moment, as Laocoön lets out an anguished yell and struggles beside his sons against Athena's sea serpents. Unearthed in Rome in 1506, the sculpture enamored Renaissance artists with its idealized proportions and graceful, muscular figures. Laocoön and his Sons most likely served as artistic inspiration for El Greco, who would depict the subject during his "Spanish Period".

== Description ==
=== Foreground ===
El Greco's version of the classical subject captures the last dying struggle of Laocoön and his sons. Laocoön, the central figure of the painting, lies down in agony on the undulating, dark rocks of the foreground. Sprawled against the foreshortened, dead body of one of his sons, Laocoön clings to life as a serpent bites his head. On the left, Laocoön's standing son contorts in pain, writhing as a serpent swoops in towards his abdomen. Flanking the scene on the right are Apollo and Artemis, who watch the grisly scene unfold. An unfinished figure consisting only of a head and leg also appears on the right.

El Greco distorted the rules of proportion by portraying the mythological characters as elongated, contorted figures. Laocoön sprawls in a strange position, unnaturally stretching out his leg in agony toward the arched, straining body of his son. The distorted figures, with their murky yellow and green coloration, infuse the scene with a sense of suffering and turmoil. The dark, sinister rocks of the foreground add to the intense emotional atmosphere.

=== Background ===
El Greco places the classical subject against a gloomy view of Toledo. El Greco's use of Toledo as the backdrop for his depiction of Laocoön's death may be based on local folklore that the people of Toledo descended from the Trojans. In the painting, the Trojan horse moves towards the city, a reminder of Laocoön's failed attempt to convince his countrymen of the trap. El Greco portrays the city of Toledo as a world of suffering, using color to create a sense of doom. The high horizon line and the standing figures at the ends of the painting create a vertical composition. Dominated by turbulent shades of grey and swirling clouds, the threatening sky looms over Toledo and creates an eerie background that adds to the suffering of the foreground.

== Style ==
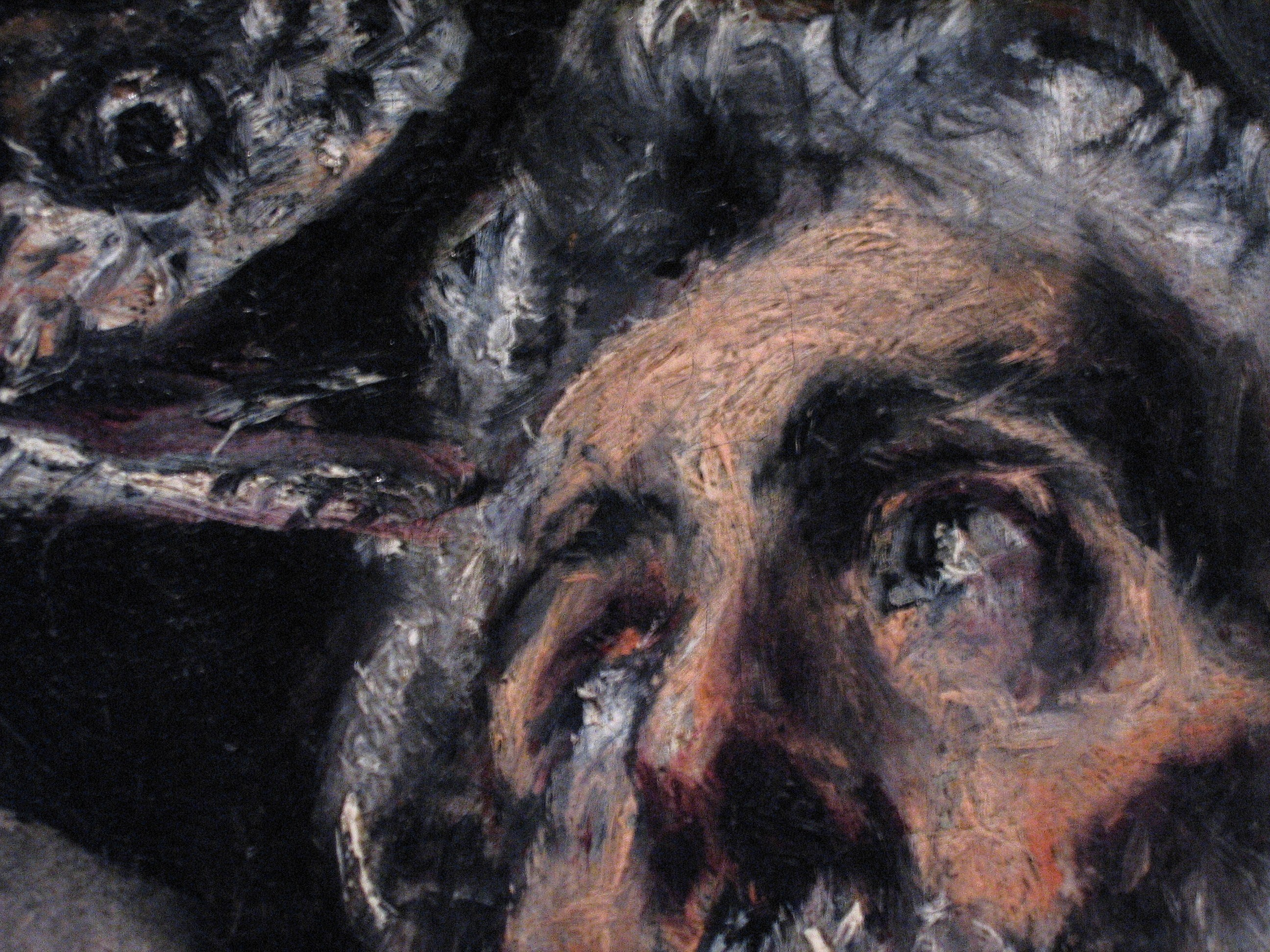
Detail

After his initial training as a Byzantine icon painter in his homeland Crete, El Greco studied in Venice and Rome, where he experimented with the Venetian "colorito" and Renaissance compositional techniques. However, El Greco moved to Spain in 1576, and he settled in Toledo in 1577 as a church painter. In Toledo, El Greco honed his eclectic style, becoming a leading artist in the Mannerist movement and inaugurating the Spanish artistic Renaissance. Both of these styles are evident within Laocoön, El Greco's sole painting of a mythological subject. While classical in subject, Laocoön reflects the political, religious, and artistic transformations of post-Renaissance society.

Although El Greco's intention and message are debated, Laocoön reflects a clear Mannerist influence. Mannerism, which emerged in Italy during the 1520s, reflected the religious turmoil of the Protestant Reformation. The chaos and spiritual uncertainty of the era caused Mannerist painters to reject the balance and proportionality of High Renaissance artists like Michelangelo and instead portray elongated figures. Mannerism reached its height with El Greco, as seen in the distorted, contorted figures of Laocoön and his sons and the hyper elegance of the gods on the right.

The infusion of intense religious themes, characteristic of El Greco's work during his Spanish Period, can be seen in Laocoön. While the painting may be an allusion to local tradition or a commentary on the Reformation, Laocoön contains an undeniable spiritual atmosphere. The torturous figures against the terrifying background convey an intense emotional atmosphere. The pairing of profound religious themes with Mannerist features would become a defining part of Spanish Renaissance art.

== See also ==
- List of works by El Greco
- Mannerism
- Spanish Renaissance
