= Jatta National Archaeological Museum =

- Museo Archeologico Nazionale Jatta
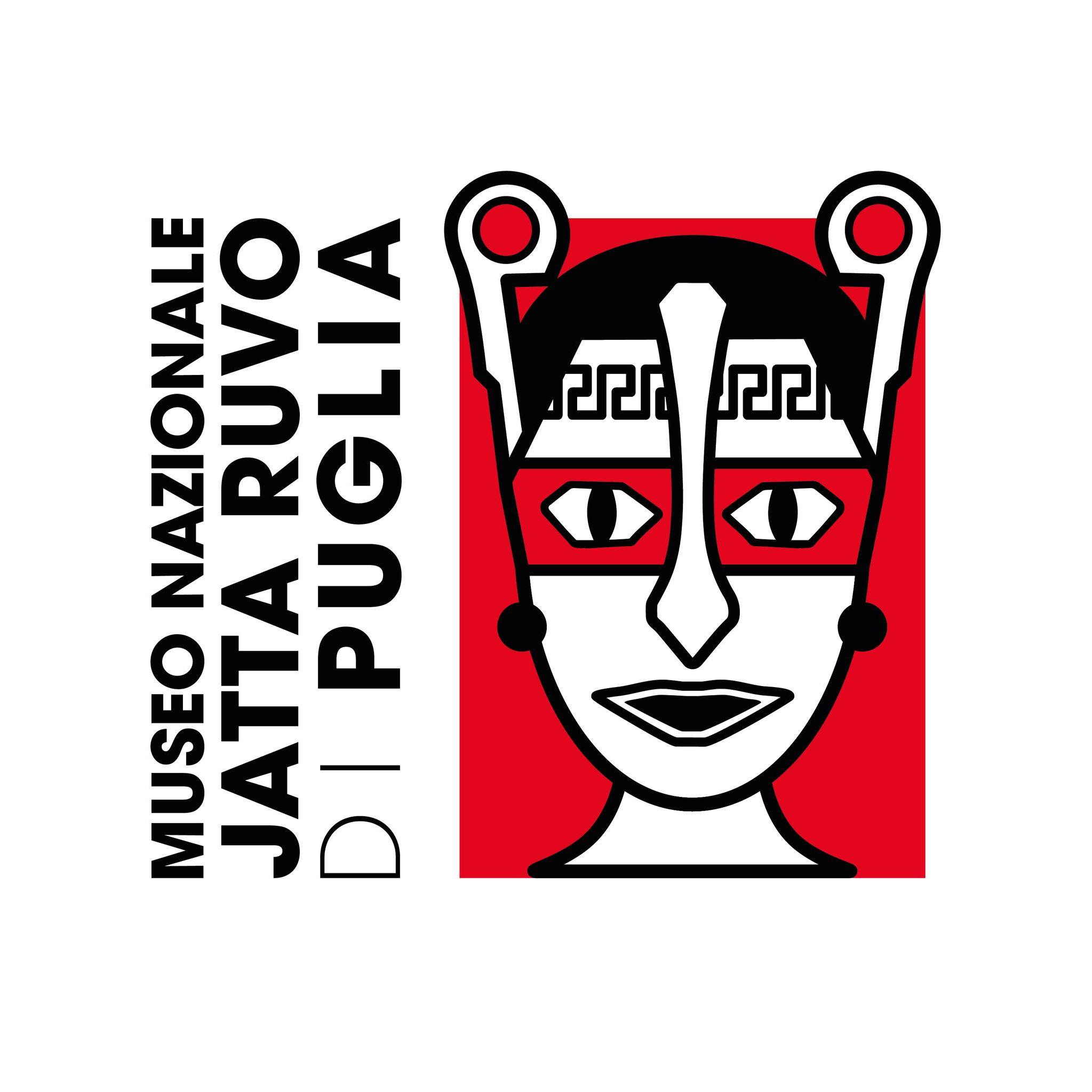

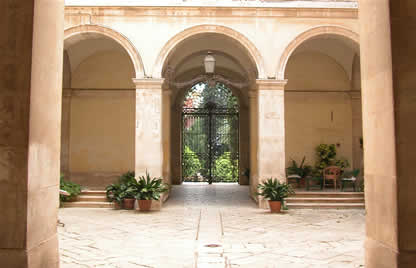
- Courtyard at the entrance to the Museum, in the Jatta Palace
- Former name: Museo Archeologico Jatta
- Established: 1993
- Location: Piazza Giovanni Bovio, 35, 70037 Ruvo di Puglia, Italy
- Coordinates: 41°06′49.08″N 16°29′09.06″E
- Type: Archaeological museum
- Key holdings: Talos Vase
- Collections: Ancient Greek art, Hellenistic Art, Pottery of ancient Greece, Ancient Roman art
- Collection size: 2,000 circa
- Visitors: 10872 (2015)
- Founders: Giovanni Jatta senior, Giovanni Jatta junior
- Director: Claudia Lucchese
- Owners: Italian Republic; Ministry of Culture; Government of the Comune of Ruvo di Puglia
- Website: musei.puglia.beniculturali.it/musei/museo-archeologico-nazionale-jatta/

The Jatta National Archaeological Museum in Ruvo di Puglia, a historic and artistic city in southern Italy, is housed in rooms of Palazzo Jatta and represents the only example in Italy of a nineteenth-century private collection that has remained unaltered from its original museographic concept. The finds preserved in the museum were collected by the archaeologist Giovanni Jatta in the early nineteenth century and his collection was subsequently enriched by his nephew of the same name and was sold to the Italian state in the twentieth century.

Since December 2014 the Ministry for Cultural Heritage and Activities has been managing it through the Apulia Museum Complex, which in December 2019 became the Regional Directorate for Museums.

== History of the Jatta collection ==
The year 1822 brought Ruvo di Puglia on the lips of all the citizens of the Kingdom of the Two Sicilies. As Giovanni Jatta junior recalls:

"People no longer came to the city to provide themselves with food; because the vendors of bread, wine and camangiari, housed in small tents, provided the necessary in the same countryside."

The fortuitous discovery in 1820 of the vascular heritage present in the subsoil triggered a real treasure hunt and all Ruvo was turned upside down not so much with the interest of setting up a museum or obtaining historically useful information, but with the intention of selling the precious pieces in order to have a personal advantage. Two years later there was a boom in excavations and even the first intellectuals began to take an interest in the finds. In addition to the looting of the ancient necropolis and the market built around the antiques, some noble Houses from Ruvo, such as Caputi, Fenicia, Jatta, Lojodice and others, set up private museums. However, all these Houses, with the exception of the Jatta, then dispersed their archaeological heritage by selling it to private individuals and often abroad, thus causing a dispersion of the stolen historical riches. The exception was represented by the Jatta, especially by Giovanni Jatta senior, magistrate in Naples, who financed various private excavations with the aim of expanding his small collection, mostly composed of coins. Aided by his brother Giulio, in 1844, the year of Giovanni Jatta's death, the collection included about five hundred finds. The heir of this huge patrimony was the nephew Giovannino, son of Giulio Jatta and Giulia Viesti, however in the will the jurist had ordered the heir to give the wealth to the King of the time to keep them in the Archaeological Museum of Naples. But Giovannino, being still too young, was taken over by his mother Giulia who, after her husband also died, decided to ask the Royal Government to leave the Jatta collection in Ruvo to be exhibited in a building used as a residence and museum. In 1848 the king consented to Mrs. Viesti's requests. With Giovanni Jatta junior's coming of age, the collection had already passed to two thousand specimens and it was up to him to arrange all the finds in the four rooms set up for the museum and in a fifth dedicated to jewelry and coins: the room-by-room arrangement of the finds. it has come down to us intact. In the following centuries some pieces discovered and found by Antonio Jatta were added. In 1991, the Jatta private collection was purchased by the State with an indemnity to the family of 9 billion lire due to the expenses incurred by the family over the years for the care of the heritage.

The museum is still arranged according to the wishes of the founders and is divided into four rooms but until the early twentieth century there were five rooms. The fifth room contained a rich medal collection, stolen in 1915 and no longer found.

The exhibits are also arranged in order of importance in fact the first room houses terracotta while the last houses the most important and famous piece, the Talos vase. In 1993 the Jatta Museum was declared national by ministerial decree, while on 11 June of the same year the Museum was reopened to the public. The rooms are accessed through the ancient wooden door in the courtyard.

== Exhibition itinerary ==
=== First room ===
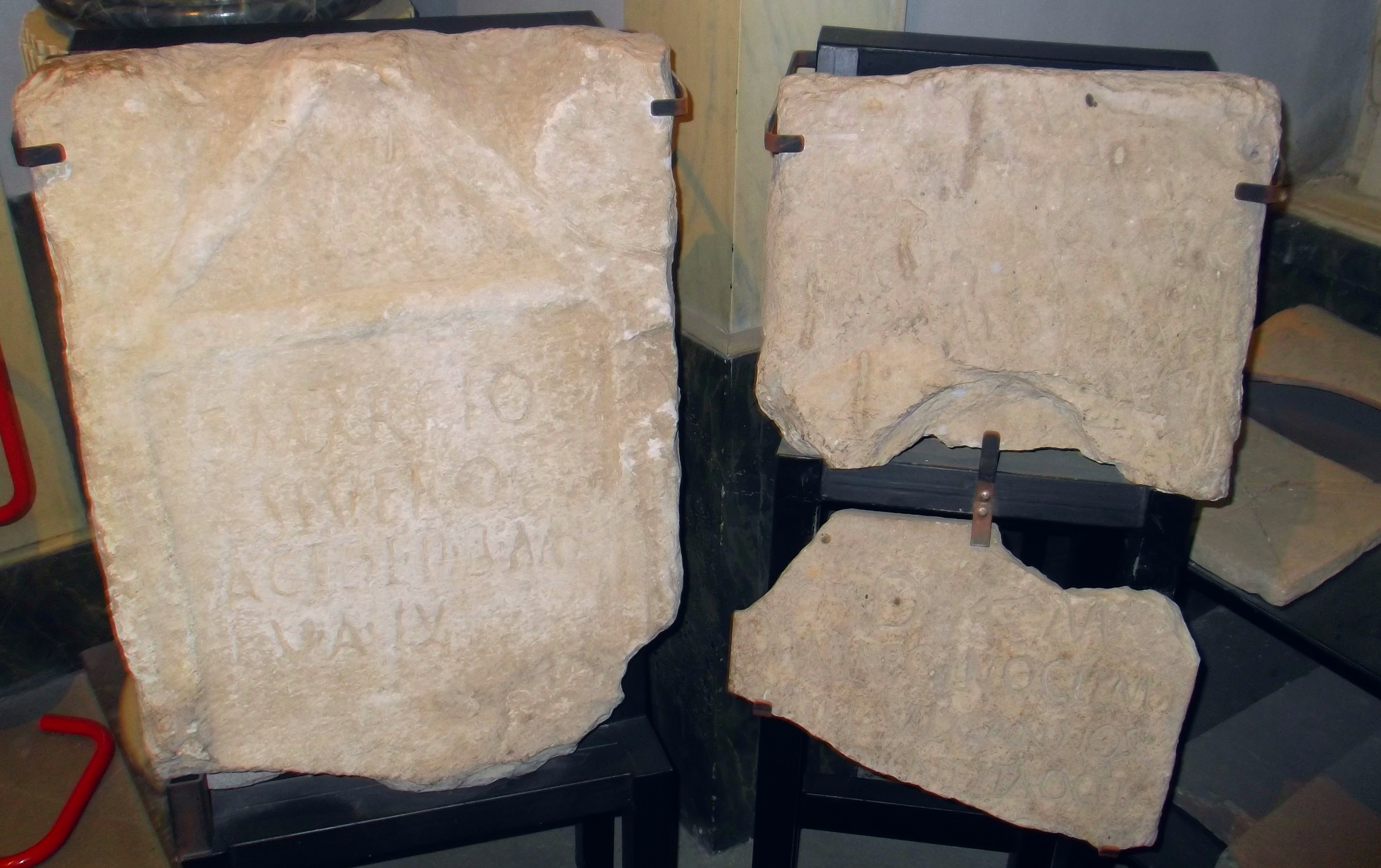
Inscriptions of the second century of the Roman Age.

In the first room there is an inscription in Latin which commemorates the founders of the Museum. Mainly there are terracotta vases with geometric decorations and dating back to the Peucetian age of the seventh and sixth centuries BC. In the center of the room there is a gigantic jar reassembled and once used for the collection of food liquids. Under the large window a tuff sarcophagus has been reconstructed with unpainted finds inside. Next to the sarcophagus there are two inscriptions engraved on Roman sepulchral plates dating back to the 2nd century: the first collects the dedication of the spouses Marcus Licinius Hermogenes and Licinia Charite to their son who died at the age of seven; the second inscription shows Julia Eutaxia's dedication to her husband.

In the adjacent showcases there are fragmentary remains of architectural decorations, statuettes called prayers for the position of the arms, a long series of tools and statuettes of divinities. The tintinnabula, small ceramic animals containing a pebble and used by children as toys arouse curiosity.

=== Second room ===
The second room, the largest, contains about 700 vases of Greek or local production. The vases were created with the technique of red figures, or red images on a black background. At the entrance to the room it is possible to admire a large crater with masks from the 4th century BC. depicting Apollo in the act of shooting arrows at the Niobids, the work of the Baltimore Painter. The vase is flanked by two amphorae from the same period but by the painter Lycurgus: the first bears the scenes of Heracles in the temple with Antigone and Creon and of the fight between Amazons and warriors around Heracles; the second, instead, the delivery of weapons to Achilles by the Nereids. Noteworthy is the Attic bell-shaped crater depicting the rise of Heracles to Olympus.

The showcases arranged all around contain a great variety of finds ranging from amphorae and vases of ever smaller dimensions to objects of funeral and daily use. In addition, a Latin inscription is preserved in this room which recalls the construction of the walls of the Roman Rubi (Ruvo).

=== Third room ===
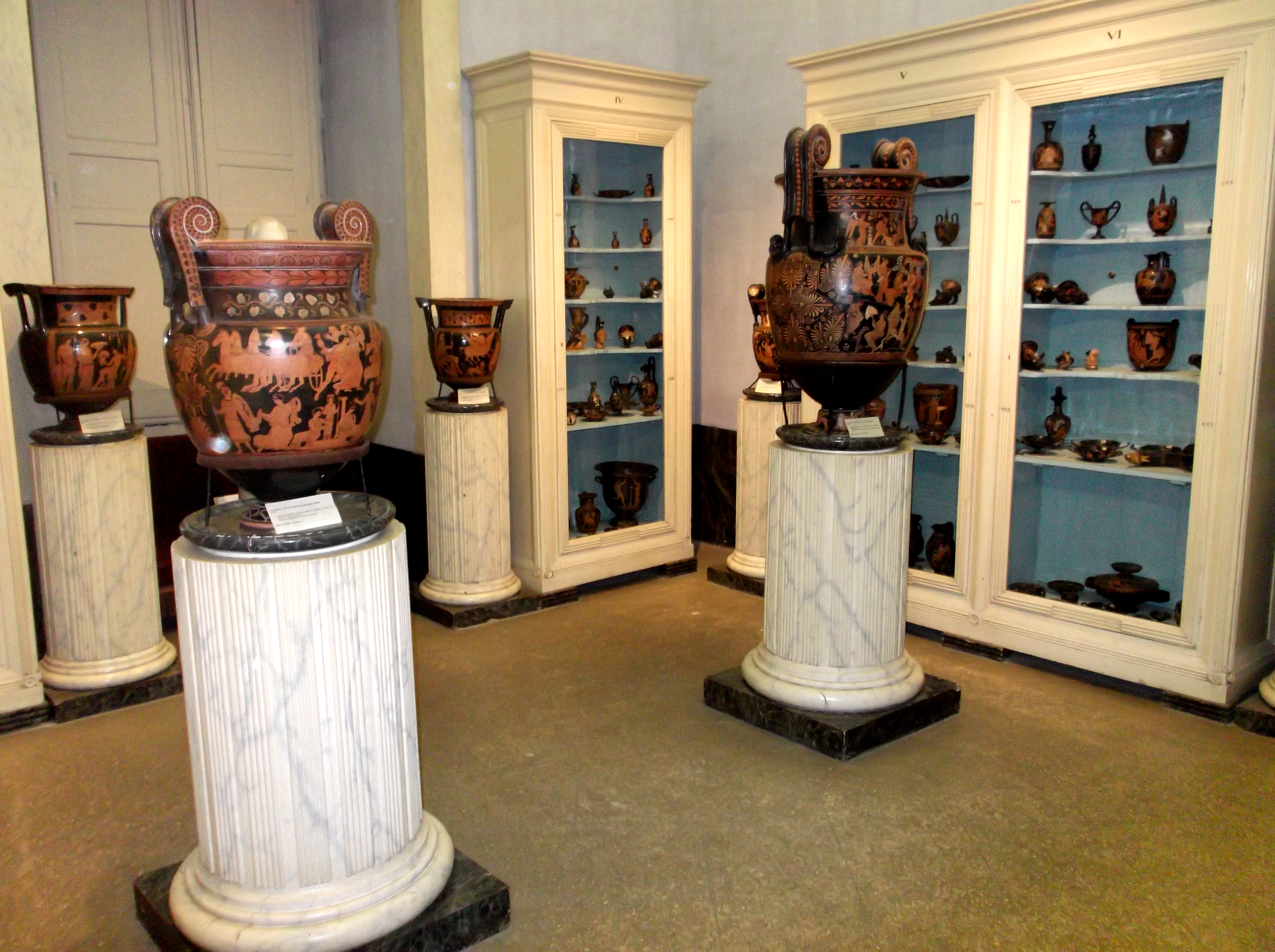
Ancient Greek vases in the Third Room.

In the third room, containing over four hundred pieces, the white marble bust of Giovanni Jatta junior stands out, who founded the Museum. The first vase placed is a Proto-Italian crater from the 4th century BC. on which Cicno are represented and the chariot of Ares is also taken up with an interesting frontal perspective.Bellerophon on Pegasus is depicted on another proto-Italian crater flanked by Athena and Poseidon, the work of the ceramographer called the Ruvo painter. A third crater of Lycurgus shows three scenes: the garden of the Hesperides on the front facade; a sacrifice to Apollo on the rear; Heracles against the bull and a Dionysian rite on the neck of the vase. On a severed column there is also another volute crater on which the myth of Phineus is painted and is the work of the painter Amykos. Other craters placed on the columns depict Theseus and Piritoo punished by Minos and the abduction of the Leucippids.

A large number of rhyta, glasses in the shape of human or animal heads are kept in the display cases, including some Atticans and some Iapygians. There is also a pelike representing the meeting between Paris and Helen mediated by Venus, a kantharos with the figure of a bearded old man and an askos.

=== Fourth room ===
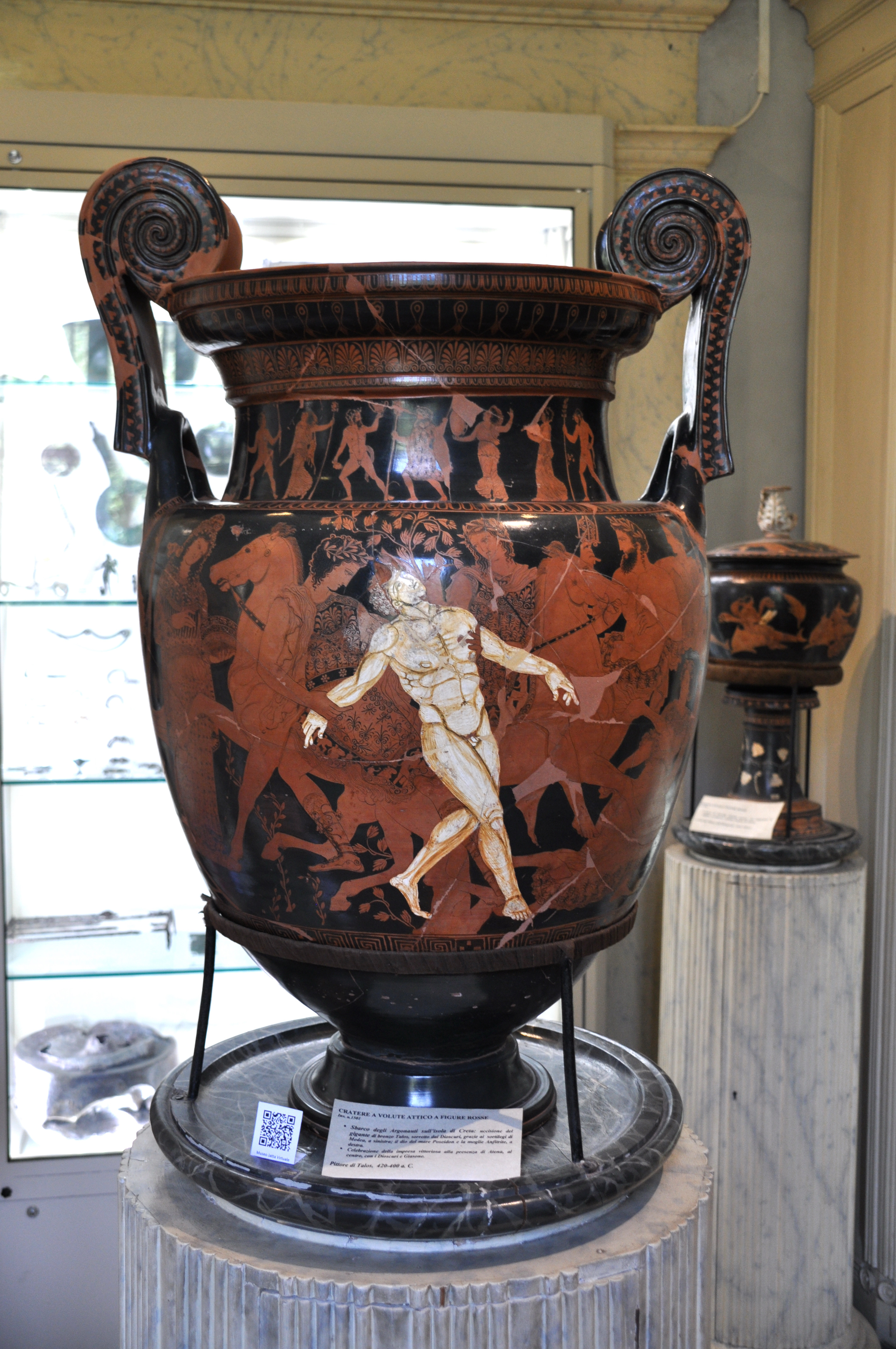
The Talos Vase, the symbol of the Museum and the City of Ruvo.

The fourth room, despite being the smallest, collects the most precious finds, about two hundred and seventy. Here too there is a marble bust but here Giovanni Jatta senior in toga is depicted. A pelike is preserved that takes up the myth of the Nereids and two specimens of lebetes. There are also two volute craters, one of which represents Bellerophon reading his death sentence and another on which a chariot race is painted.

In the showcases, double-sided rhyta are kept as well as necklaces and balsam pieces in glass paste. Also important is the kylix with the figure of a naked young man. Next to it is a lekythos depicting the singing competition between Tamiri and the Muses. The second showcase collects Neolithic and Iron Age finds. The third and last showcase preserves imported Corinthian works dating from the 7th to the 6th century BC, such as some types of alabastron and ariballo.

Other vases kept are of the black-figure type and therefore belonging to the first phase of Atticans ceramics, such as the oinochoe representing Heracles against the lion Nermeo and Theseus chasing the Minotaur. The last pottery, the most valuable, is the Talos vase by the so-called Talos painter. The Museum and the city of Ruvo itself owe their fame to this vase considered one of the most important Atticans ceramic masterpieces due to the artistic innovations present such as the coloristic and perspective researches of the 5th century BC. On the vase is painted the episode narrated by Apollonius of Rhodes in the Argonautiche regarding the killing of Talos by Medea, supported dying by the arms of Castor and Pollux. Also in the room are metal objects and pieces of armor.
