= PDR =

Pdr or PDR may refer to:

== Government ==
- Preliminary Design Review, a step in the engineering design process
- Purchase of development rights — see Conservation easement
- Petition for Discretionary Review - In appellate law, a way of seeking review by a higher court when no appeal of right exists

== People ==
- Paul di Resta (born 1986), British racing driver
- Pedro de la Rosa (born 1971), Spanish racing driver
- Portia de Rossi (born 1973), Australian and American actress

== Places ==
- Peripheral Distributor Road (Cardiff)—see A4232 road
- Peripheral Distributor Road (Port Talbot)—see A4241 road
- Playa del Rey, Los Angeles, California

== Science ==
- Physicians' Desk Reference
- Proliferative Diabetic Retinopathy
- Pulsed Dose Rate, a form of brachytherapy
- Pharma Documentation Ring
- Photodissociation region

== Other ==
- Democratic Republican Party (Portugal) (Partido Democrático Republicano), a Portuguese political party
- Magpul PDR (Personal Defense Rifle)
- Paintless dent repair, also known as paintless dent removal
- Partido para sa Demokratikong Reporma, a Philippine political party
- Pedestrian Dead Reckoning
- People's Democratic Republic
- Personal development reviews are a year-round process with an annual review meeting to summarise the year gone and plan the year ahead.
- Population and Development Review
- Perfection Dolls Revolution, an online group based on SpaceHey and Instagram.
