= Automobile repair shop =

Shop where automobiles are repaired by mechanics and electricians

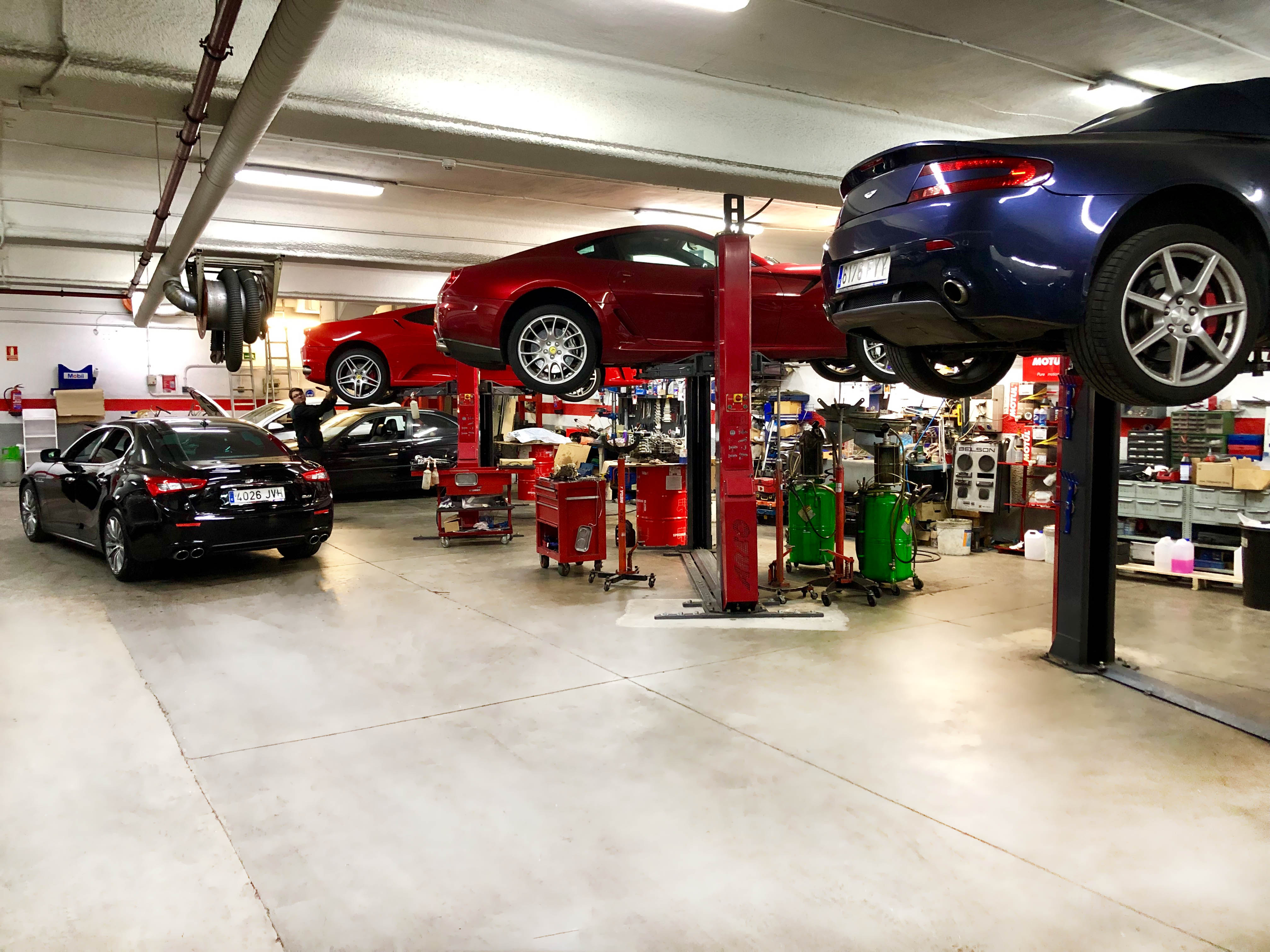
Auto mechanic working under car lifts

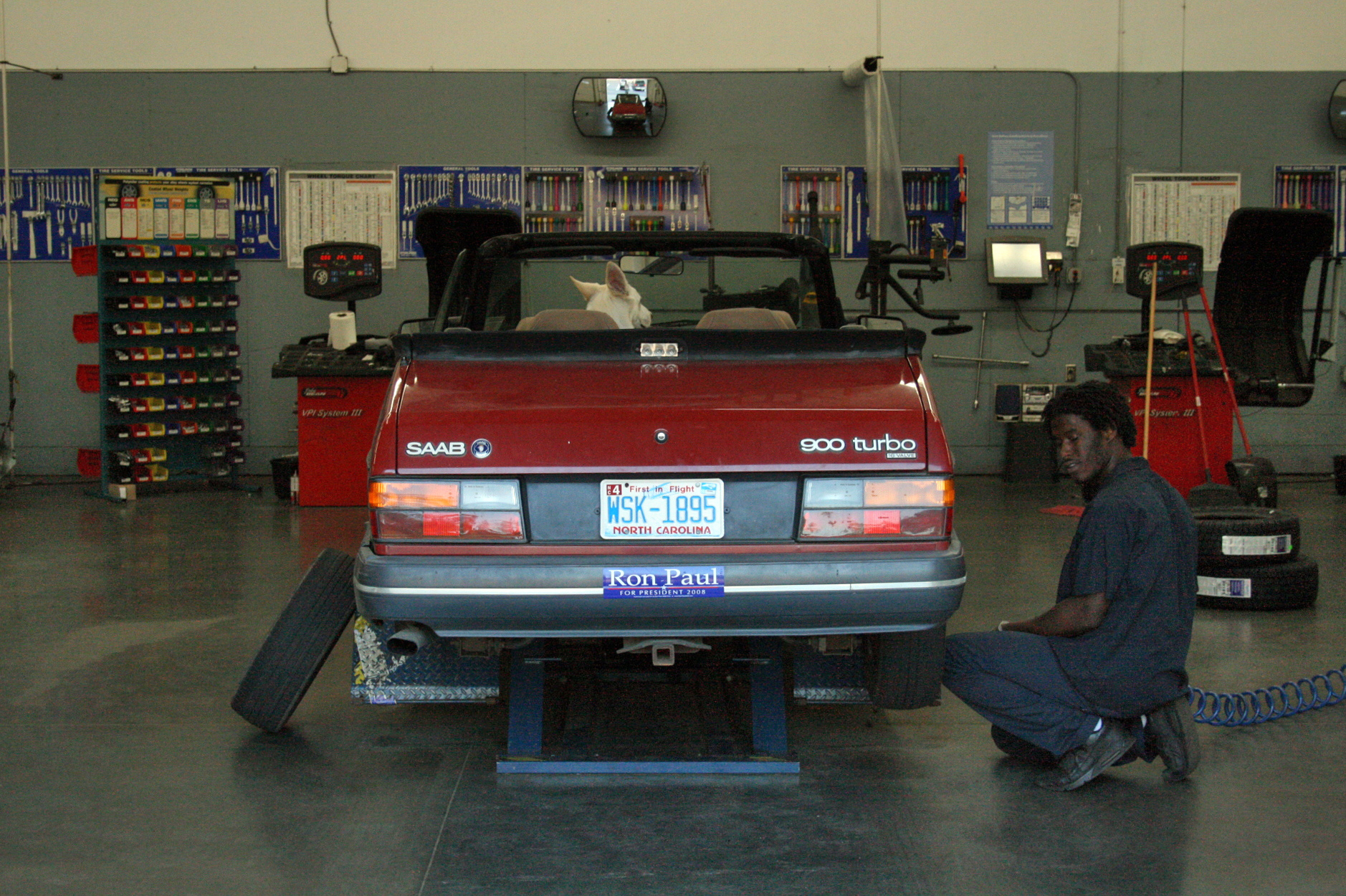
A Saab 900 Turbo convertible undergoing regular maintenance at a Sam's Club service garage

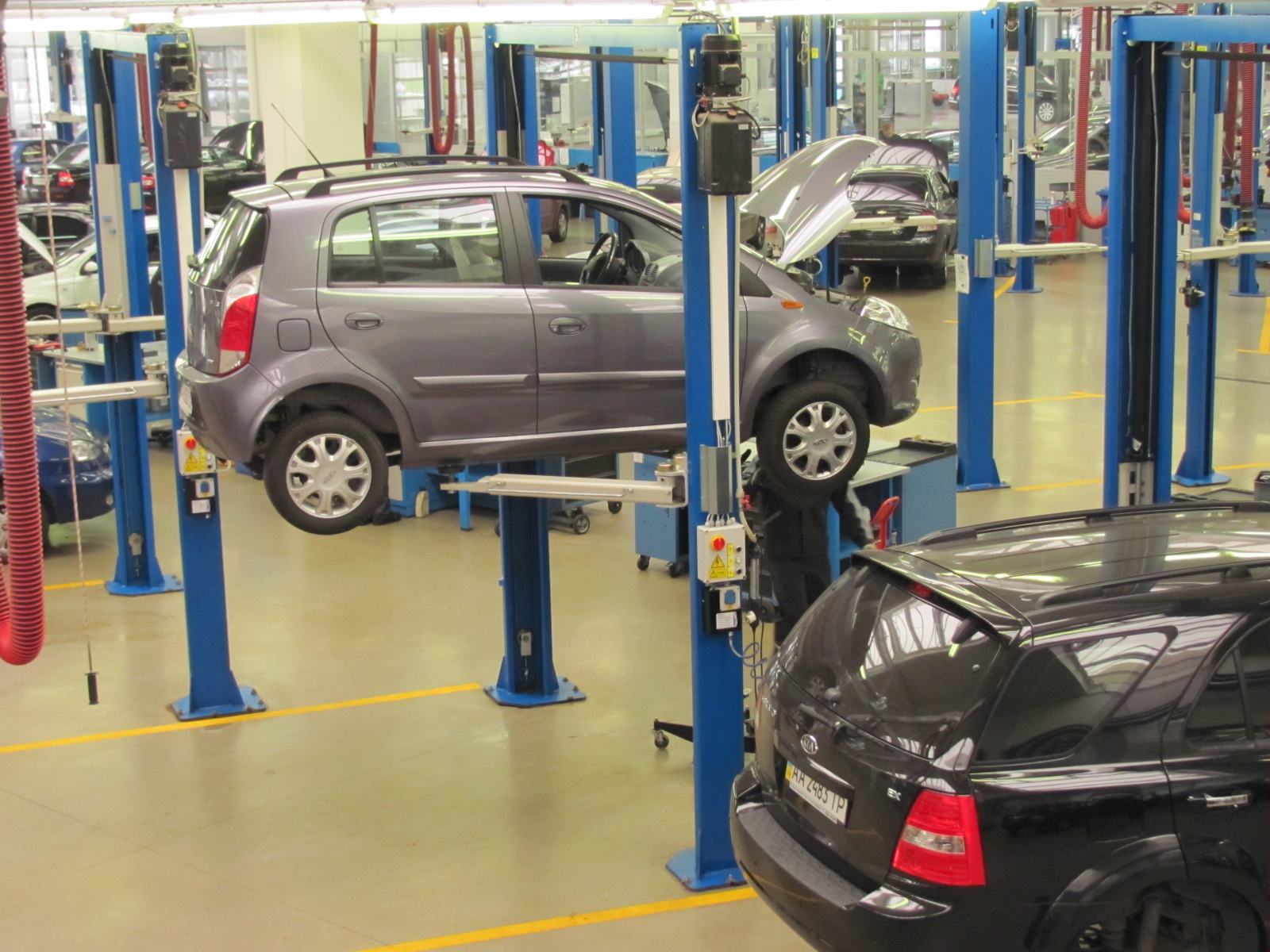
A Chery A1 undergoing regular maintenance at a service garage in Ukraine

An automobile repair shop (also known regionally as a garage or a workshop, simply the shop) is an establishment where automobiles are repaired by auto mechanics and technicians. The customer interface is typically a service advisor, traditionally called a service writer.

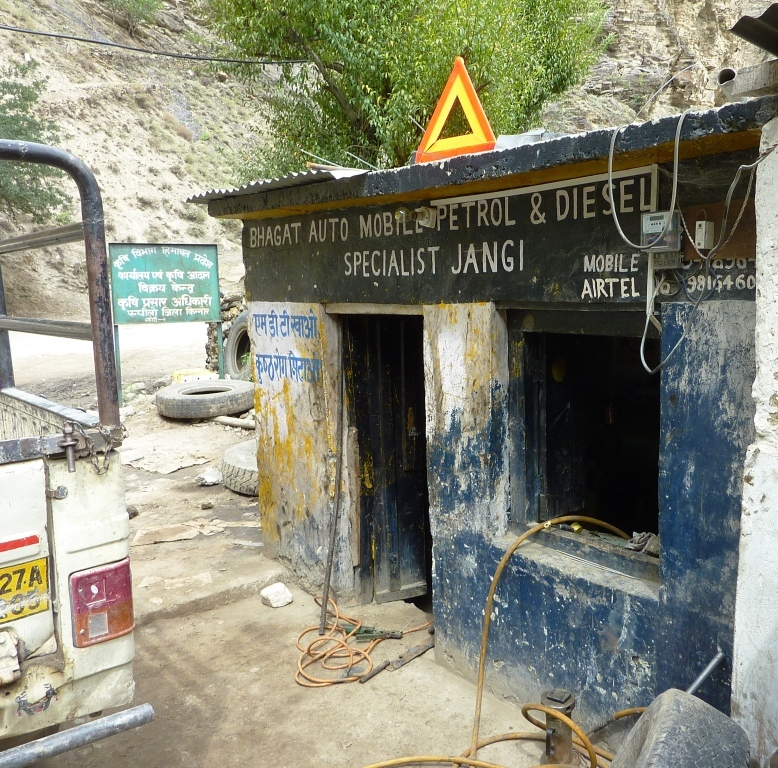
Automobile repair shop near Nako, H.P. India. 2010

== Types ==
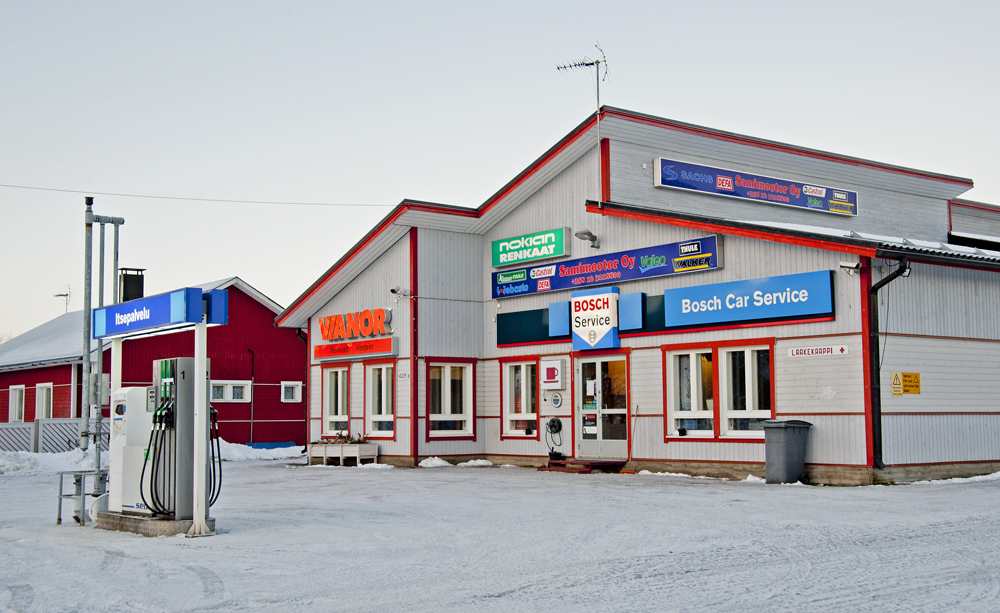
Samimootor, a car repair shop and filling station in Nuorgam, Utsjoki, Finland

Automotive garages and repair shops can be divided into following categories:

=== Service station ===
First appearing in the early 1900s, many filling stations offered vehicle repair services as part of their full service operation. This once popular trend has declined significantly over the years as many locations found it more profitable to exchange vehicle service bays for grocery isles, which ultimately led to the emergence of the quick oil change industry.

=== Lubrication/safety shop ===
Commonly referred to as a quick lube or express service shop, this type of facility specializes in preventive maintenance and safety inspections rather than repairs. Product sales are typically limited to automotive fluids, belts and hoses. With a focus on basic procedures, labor is often performed by entry-level technicians which simplifies the business overhead resulting in a less expensive service as compared to a traditional automotive workshop.

=== New car dealership ===
In the United States, new car dealerships have service departments that are certified by their respective OEM (Original Equipment Manufacturer) to perform warranty and recall repairs. Customer-pay repairs can also be completed, however most service departments tend to only work on the vehicle brand of which they are a dealer. Dealership technicians must complete additional training provided by the OEM, and in doing so become specialized and certified for that particular vehicle make.

=== Independent auto repair shop ===
Independent auto repair shops are businesses that are independently owned and operated. In states regulating a smog or emission test, often, independent auto repair shops offer these tests as well. These may also include regional or national chains and franchises. It is rather common for a dealership technician to start this type of competing business after leaving the employment of a new car dealership. Independent automobile repair shops in the US may also achieve OEM certification through manufacturer sponsored programs. European Union law (The EC Block Exemption Regulation 1400/2002 (October 2003)) permits motorists more flexibility in selecting where their car is serviced. Maintenance and service work does not have to be done by the dealership providing that the independent garage uses Original Equipment 'Matching Quality' parts and follows the manufacturer's service schedules. The Block Exemption Regulation (BER) covers service and maintenance during the warranty period and prohibits vehicle manufacturers' warranties from including restrictive conditions.

=== Fleet shop ===
A shop that is dedicated to repairing and maintaining a particular group of vehicles is called a fleet shop. Common examples of a fleet include taxi cabs, police cars, mail trucks and rental vehicles. Similar to a lubrication/safety shop, a fleet shop focuses primarily on preventative maintenance and safety inspections, and will often outsource larger or more complex repairs to another repair facility.

=== Engine machine shop ===
Shops that specialize in cylinder head and cylinder block machining are called engine machine shops. These facilities utilize large electromechanical machines that are not found in the average automotive repair shop. In the US, engine machining is typically performed by an ASE certified machinist in order to correct worn or damaged engine components as an alternative to component replacement. Performance engine building is another popular service frequently offered by this type of workshop.

=== Tire and wheel shop ===
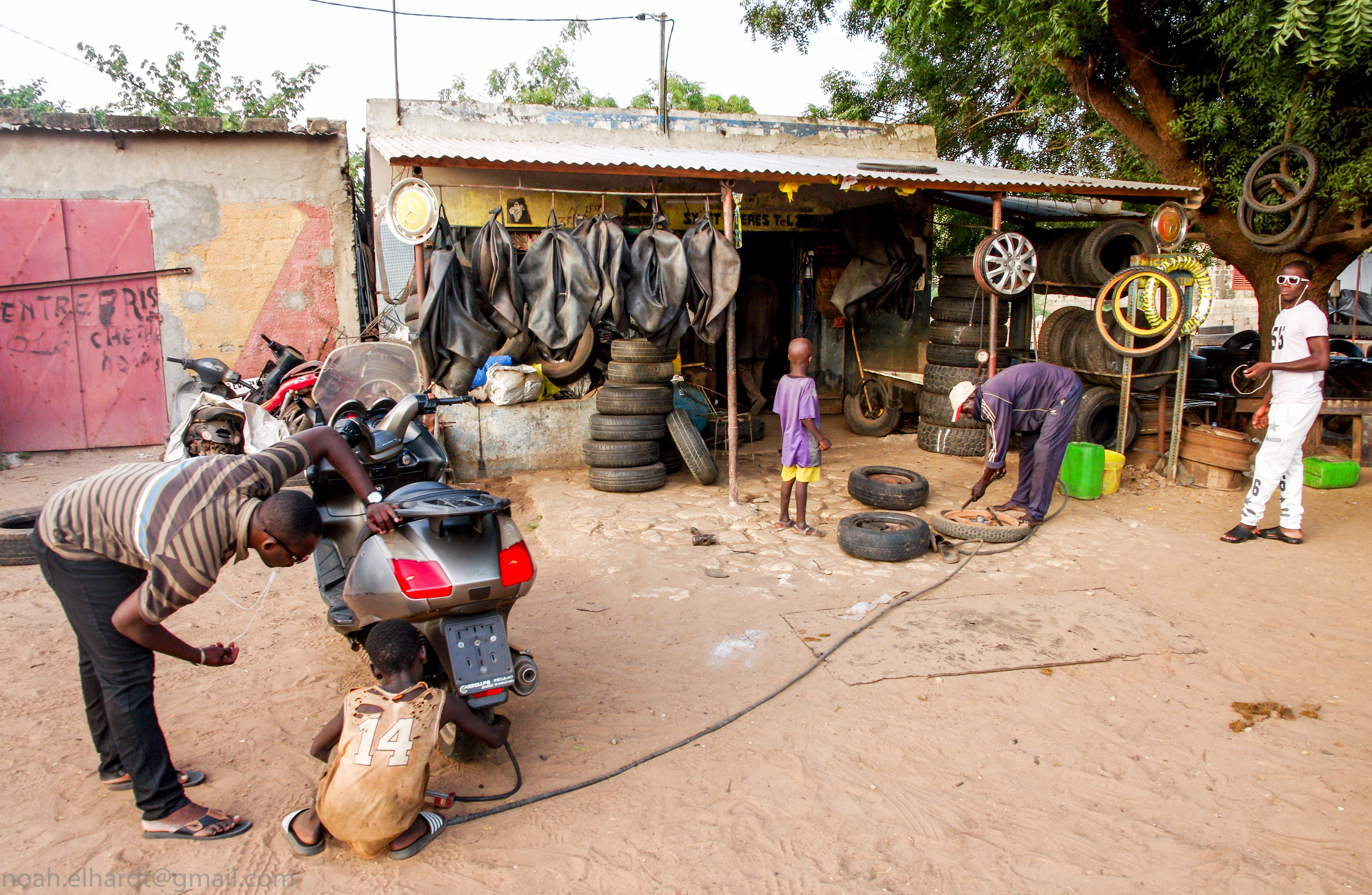
A tire repair shop in Senegal

Some repair shops specialize in tires and wheels. These businesses usually have a large inventory of tires and aftermarket wheels, some of which may be on display while others require special ordering. In addition to parts, common labor services include tire rotation, balancing and repair as well as wheel alignment which can prevent premature tire wear.

In the Philippines, roadside tire repair shops are called vulcanizing shops in Philippine English. They specialize in quickly and cheaply repairing flat tires by patching punctures with a rubber compound patch.

=== Muffler shop ===
A muffler shop, also called an exhaust shop, is a business model that concentrates solely on the engine exhaust system. These facilities utilize large tubing benders which allow a technician to fabricate a new exhaust system out of otherwise straight lengths of pipe. Welding is often necessary in this line of work.

=== Auto body ===
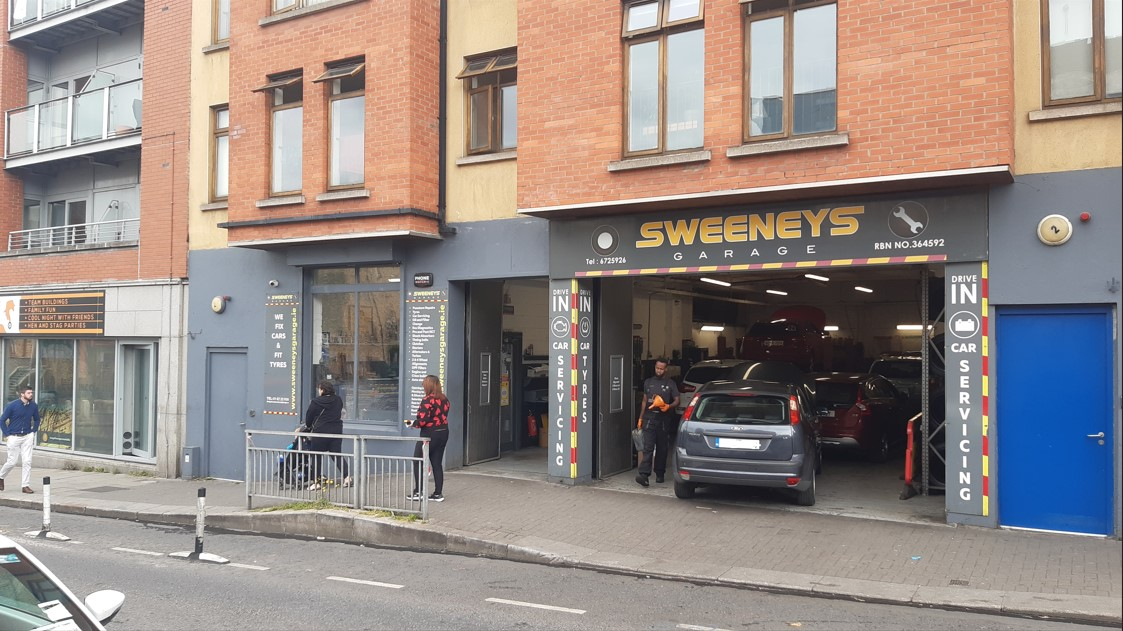
An inner-city garage situated beneath residential apartments in Dublin, Ireland in 2024

Automotive repair shops that specialize in bodywork repair are known as body shops. Auto body technicians can perform paintwork repairs to scratches, scuffs and dents, as well as repairs to the bodies of vehicles damaged by collisions. Many body shops now offer paintless dent repair and auto glass replacement. Automotive repair shops that specialize in auto glass repair are known as auto glass repair shops. They offer auto glass repairs to chips, cracks and shattered glass. The types of glass they repair include windshields, car windows, quarter glass and rear windows. This type of damage is often caused by hail, stones, wild animals, fallen trees, automobile theft and vandalism.

=== Mobile mechanics ===
Mobile mechanics provide doorstep repair services and home delivery of new and used auto parts of different late model and classic cars whose parts are not widely available in the market.

In countries such as the UK, the mobile car body repair sectors has experienced high growth by way of mobile SMART Repair companies providing mobile car body repair services, such as Bumper Repairs, auto body repair, paintless dent repair and paintwork defect repairs to private and commercial consumers, typically within the industry framework of refinishing vehicle damage on a localised basis, where the area of damage being repaired is not in excess of an A4 sheet of paper.

== See also ==
- Auto mechanic
- Automotive Service Excellence (ASE)
- Breakdown (vehicle)
- Preventive maintenance
- Service Labor Time Standards
- List of automotive tools and equipment
