= Truglia =

Truglia is a surname. Notable people with the surname include:

- Christel Truglia (born 1936), American politician
- Jerry Truglia, American automotive mechanic
- Steve Truglia (1962–2016), English stuntman

== See also ==
- Truglia Tower, historic tower in Sperlonga, Lazio
