= Panel beater =

Occupation that repairs damaged vehicles

Panel beater/Auto body mechanic
Occupation
- Occupation type: Vocational
- Activity sectors: Automobile

Description
- Education required: Apprenticeship
- Related jobs: Auto mechanic

Panel beater or panelbeater is a term used in some Commonwealth countries to describe a person who restores vehicle bodies back to their factory state after having been damaged (e.g., after being involved in a collision). In the United States and Canada, the same job is done by an auto body technician or sheet metal worker at a body shop.

== Description ==
Panel beaters repair body work using skills such as planishing and metalworking techniques, welding, use of putty fillers, and other skills. Accident repair may require the panel beater to repair or replace parts of a vehicle. These parts may be made from various metals including steels and alloys, many different plastics, fibreglass and others.

The common panel beater will work on everyday vehicles, cars, vans or 4WDs. Specialised areas include repairs to motorcycles, trucks and even aircraft. Some panel beaters also work exclusively on vehicle restorations, and do not repair smash work at all. Others may specialise in body customisation such as is seen on hot rods.

Special equipment examples:

- Various hammers and dollies used for planishing
- Body files and flippers
- Assembly tools such as socket sets, screwdrivers and spanners
- Other hand tools like pliers, tin snips, vise grips, punches, chisels, etc.
- Hydraulic pushing/pulling devices
- Vehicle measuring and aligning devices, or jigs e.g.
- Vehicle lift hoists
- Personal safety equipment such as boots, overalls, safety glasses, welding helmets, gloves, respirators and hearing protection
- Welding equipment – MIG or TIG
- Stud welder for pulling out dents

Special equipment for restoration, advanced panel repair or panel fabrication from scratch include:

- English wheel
- Power hammer
- Pear shaped mallets and sandbags
- Benders/folders
- Rollers/rolls
- Beaders/swaging machines
- Station bucks
- Templates
- Oxy-acetylene welding equipment
- Lead loading equipment

== Training and certification ==
Training to become a panel beater is most often done by completing a trade apprenticeship. For the most part these apprenticeships are around three years long, but can be completed earlier. These usually consist of three years on the job training mixed with schooling at a trade school or TAFE. The fourth year is usually on the job training alone.
