= SLTS =

SLTS may refer to:

- Service Labor Time Standards, used by automotive manufacturers
- Sugar Land Town Square, an office and shopping complex in Sugar Land, Texas, United States
