= Jerry Truglia =

Jerry Truglia, also known by G, is an automotive instructor and author whose work with the US Environmental Protection Agency, Society of Automotive Engineers, National Automotive Service Task Force, Council of Advanced Automotive Trainers, Professional Tool and Equipment News, and the not-for-profit Technicians Service Training has made him nationally recognized in the automotive repair industry.

== Biography ==
Truglia is well known for his automotive training through his company Automotive Technician Training Services, where he covers topics ranging from hybrid vehicles, electricity, to Heavy Duty Truck repair. Truglia's 2001 book Getting to Know OBD II won a Motor Magazine Top 20 Award. He is amongst the nation's first automotive instructors to provide webcast training. Truglia has also written articles for periodicals including Motor Age. He was historically involved with the Automotive Repair franchise Car-Tune in the 80s and 90s but is now professionally involved with Car Clinic in Mahopac, New York.

== Charitable Work ==
Truglia took a leadership role as the former-President of Service Technicians Society in helping the victims of the September 11 Attacks.

As President of Technicians Service Training, a 501(c)(3) not-for-profit Truglia helps provide continuing education to automotive mechanics.

== See also ==
- Auto mechanic
- Automotive Service Excellence
