= Pablo Maurer =

American sports journalist and photographer

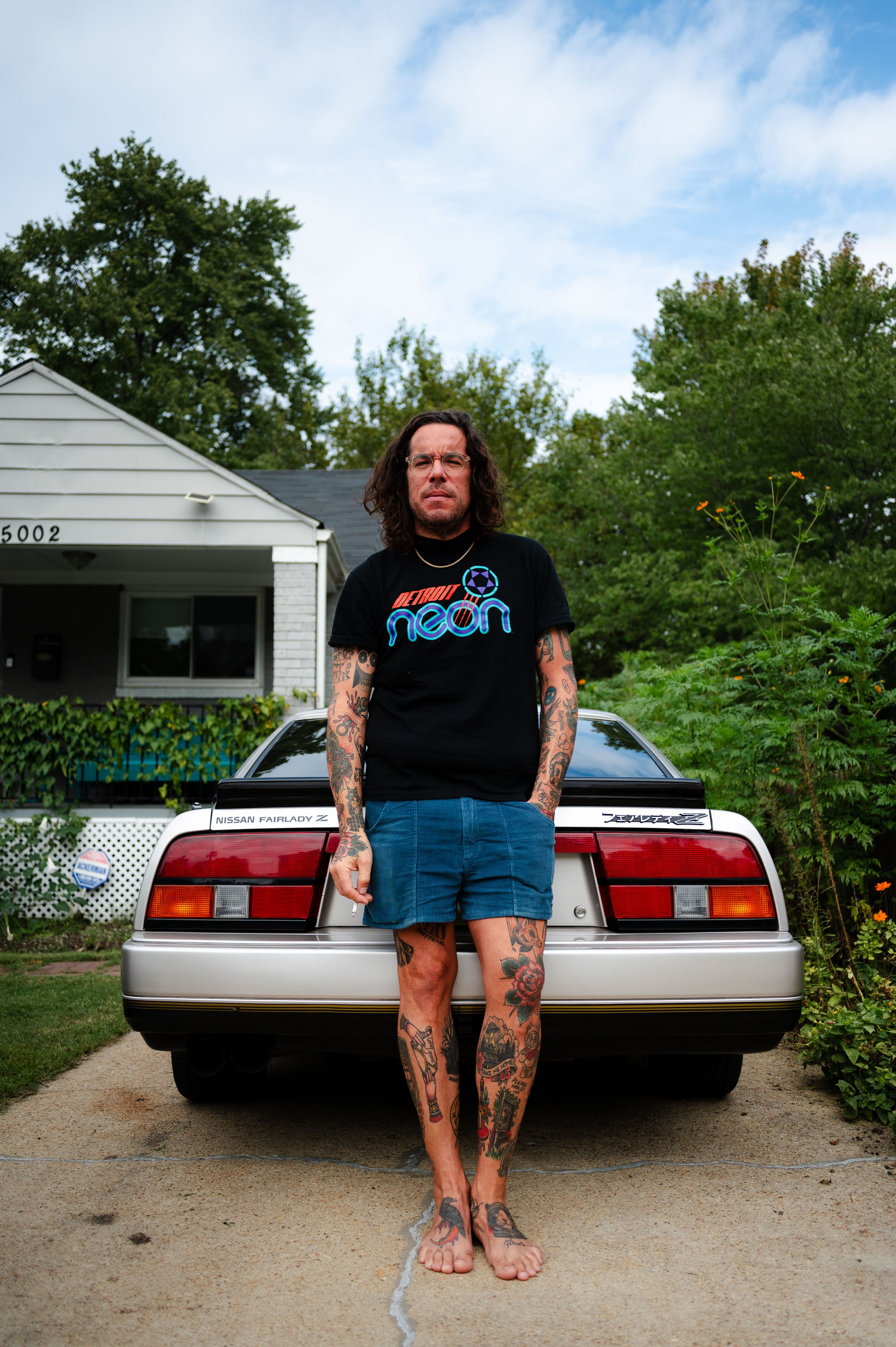
Pablo Maurer with his Nissan Fairlady Z, November 2024

Pablo Iglesias Maurer is an American sports journalist and photographer who covers soccer in North America, including Major League Soccer (MLS) and U.S. Soccer. From 2017 to 2025, he was a staff writer at The Athletic, where he produced long-form features, investigative reporting, and cultural stories related to the sport. He currently writes for The Guardian.

== Career ==
Maurer began his journalism career writing for outlets such as DCist, Gothamist, Smithsonian Magazine, Washington City Paper, and The Nashville Scene, covering topics including soccer culture, local news, and historical features. He joined The Athletic in 2017 as a staff writer, contributing in-depth pieces focused on MLS, U.S. Soccer, and the broader history of the game in North America.

In 2021, Maurer was part of a reporting team that received first place in the Associated Press Sports Editors (APSE) investigative category for coverage of institutional failures and abuse in women's soccer.

One of his most prominent stories is the 2022 article "The disappearance of Wee Willie McLean," which investigated the long-unexplained vanishing of former U.S. national team player Willie McLean. The reporting was later used as the foundation for McLean's Wikipedia biography. In 2025, Maurer announced on social media that he was writing a book, co-authored with journalist Matt Pentz, expanding on their investigation into the case.

In April 2025, Maurer departed The Athletic. According to reports, his exit came ahead of the 2026 FIFA World Cup and followed internal restructuring at the publication.

In November 2025, Maurer led a Guardian investigation into allegations of misconduct by Philadelphia Union sporting director Ernst Tanner. The reporting detailed accusations by multiple former Union employees and prompted Major League Soccer to reopen its own inquiry. Following the publication, the league placed Tanner on leave pending the results of its investigation.

=== Selected works ===
- The story behind the most famous photo shoot in American soccer history (2022)
- David Villa, NYCFC, and alleged harassment (2020)
- The disappearance of Wee Willie McLean (2022)

== Photography ==
Maurer has also produced photography projects, including the series Abandoned States, which documents deteriorating American landmarks such as resorts and stadiums. The series pairs contemporary images with vintage postcards and matchbooks to explore changes in landscape and infrastructure. His photographic work has been featured in publications such as National Geographic and Smithsonian Magazine. The project was also featured in a video published by Condé Nast Traveler titled "Postcards from the Past: America’s Abandoned Resorts" which visually explored his recreation techniques and artistic approach.

== Other work ==
He has served as a judge for the North American Soccer Business & Media Awards.

Maurer appears in Club Eleven’s GRAILS series, showcasing his personal collection of American soccer memorabilia.

He is an ASE-certified Master Automobile Technician with over twenty years’ experience restoring vintage vehicles.

== Personal life ==
Maurer is of Spanish-American heritage and was raised bilingual. His father, Christopher Maurer, is a professor and scholar of Spanish literature, best known for his translations and editorial work on the writings of Federico García Lorca and his mother, María Estrella Iglesias, is an educator and jewelry designer. Pablo resides in the United States and is active on social media under the handle @MLSist.
