= Sperlonga =

- Comune
- Comune di Sperlonga
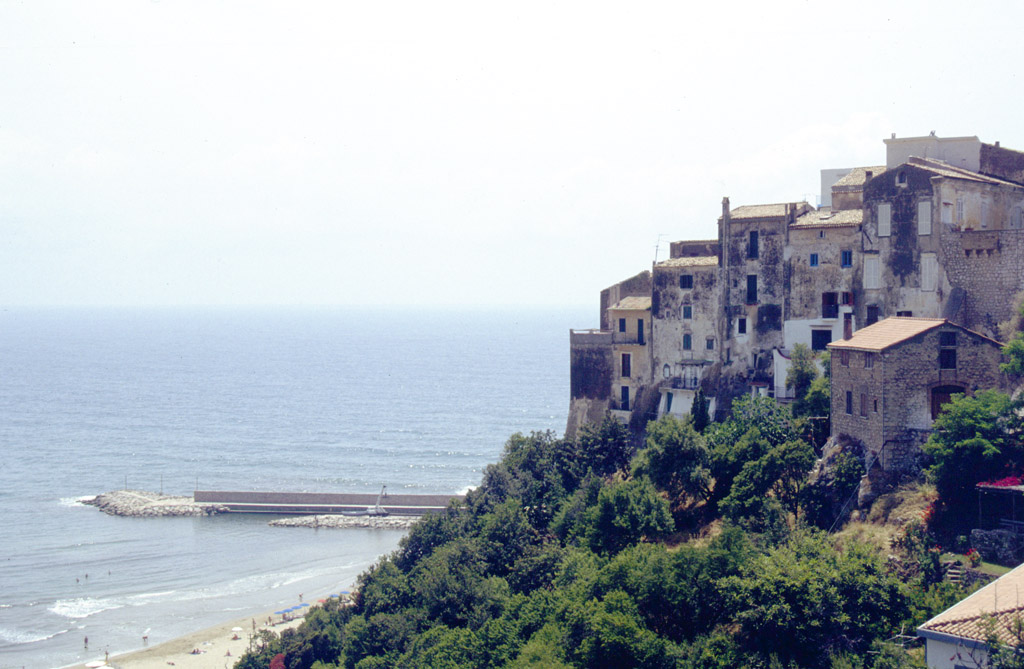
- View of Sperlonga

- Coat of arms

- Location within Italy Location within Lazio
- Coordinates: 41°16′N 13°26′E
- Country: Italy
- Region: Lazio
- Province: Latina (LT)

Government
  - Mayor: Armando Cusani

Area
  - Total: 18 km^{2} (6.9 sq mi)
- Elevation: 55 m (180 ft)

Population (31 March 2017)
  - Total: 3,345
  - Density: 190/km^{2} (480/sq mi)
- Demonym: Sperlongani
- Time zone: UTC+1 (CET)
  - Summer (DST): UTC+2 (CEST)
- Postal code: 04029
- Dialing code: 0771
- Patron saint: St. Leo and St. Roch
- Saint day: September 2–5
- Website: Official website

Sperlonga (locally Spelonghe) is a coastal town in the province of Latina, Italy, about halfway between Rome and Naples. It is best known for the ancient Roman sea grotto discovered in the grounds of the Villa of Tiberius containing the important and spectacular Sperlonga sculptures, which are displayed in a museum on the site.

Surrounding towns include Terracina to the West, Fondi to the North, Itri to the North-East, and Gaeta to the East. It is one of I Borghi più belli d'Italia ("The most beautiful villages of Italy").

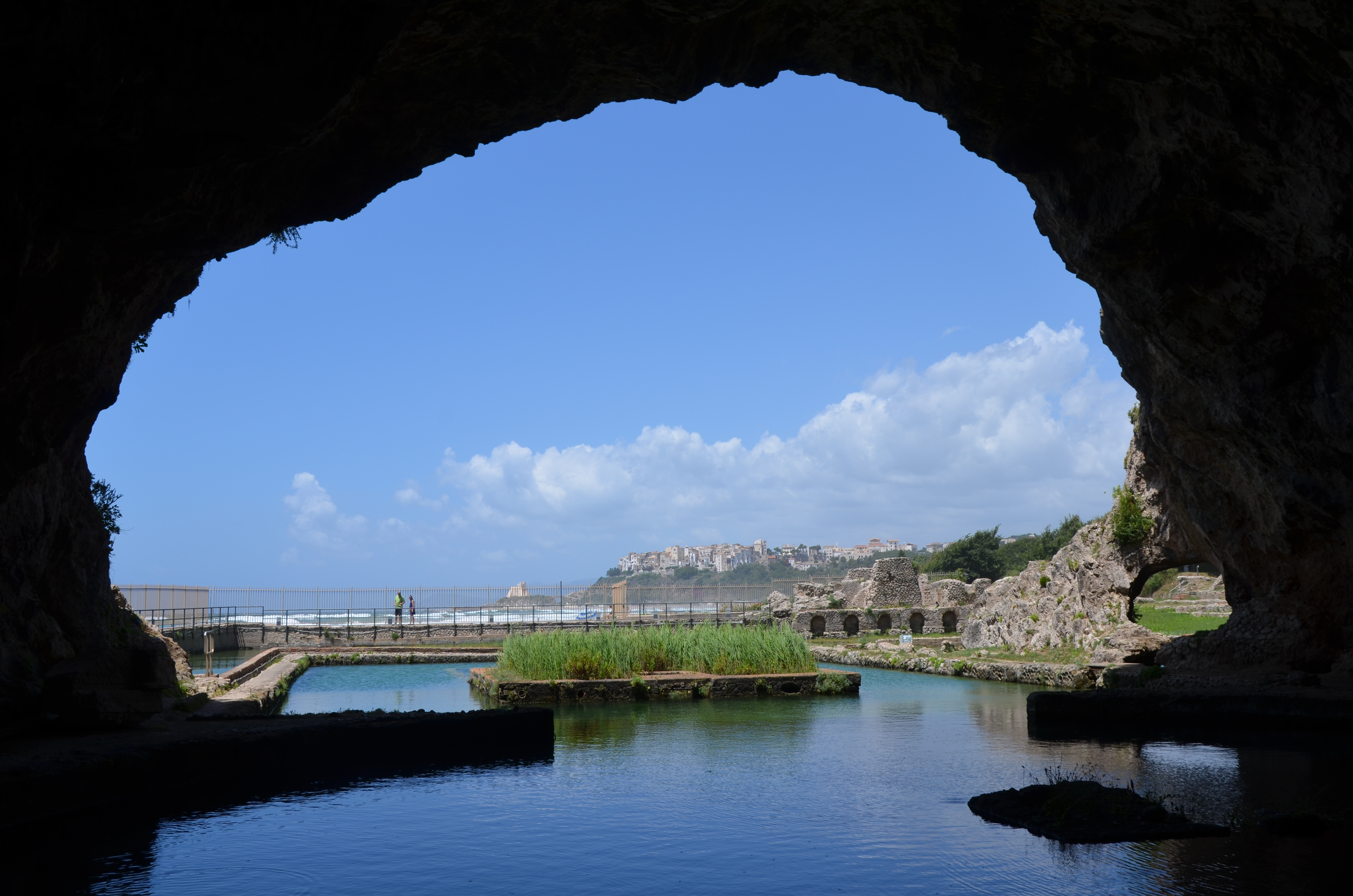
Grotto of Tiberius

== History ==
Located near the Via Flacca, but also on the edge of the Pontine Marshes, Roman Spelunca (Latin for cave or grotto) was originally only known for the grotto on the coast, after which it was named. A Republican villa was built here, later owned by the emperor Tiberius. The Grotto was embellished by Tiberius into a magnificent triclinium, mentioned by ancient writers, and with the famous exquisite sculptures which were discovered in situ.

After the fall of the Western Roman Empire, in the 6th century, the ruins of the imperial residence served as refuge for local people. Later the population began to move to the nearby promontory of St. Magnus, in order to escape the unhealthy marshes and the Saracen attacks. The danger posed by the Saracens is made clear by the presence of many watchtowers all along the coast to Gaeta. In the summer of 1534 the small centre was destroyed by the Ottoman fleet under Barbarossa, during which many inhabitants, especially women, were enslaved in the Barbary slave trade.

In the 18th and 19th centuries Sperlonga recovered and acquired some noble residences, and agriculture flourished. However, the touristic expansion occurred only after the opening of the Terracina-Gaeta coastal road (also known as the Via Flacca) in 1957, the building of which led to the discovery of the sculptures in the grotto.

== Villa of Tiberius ==
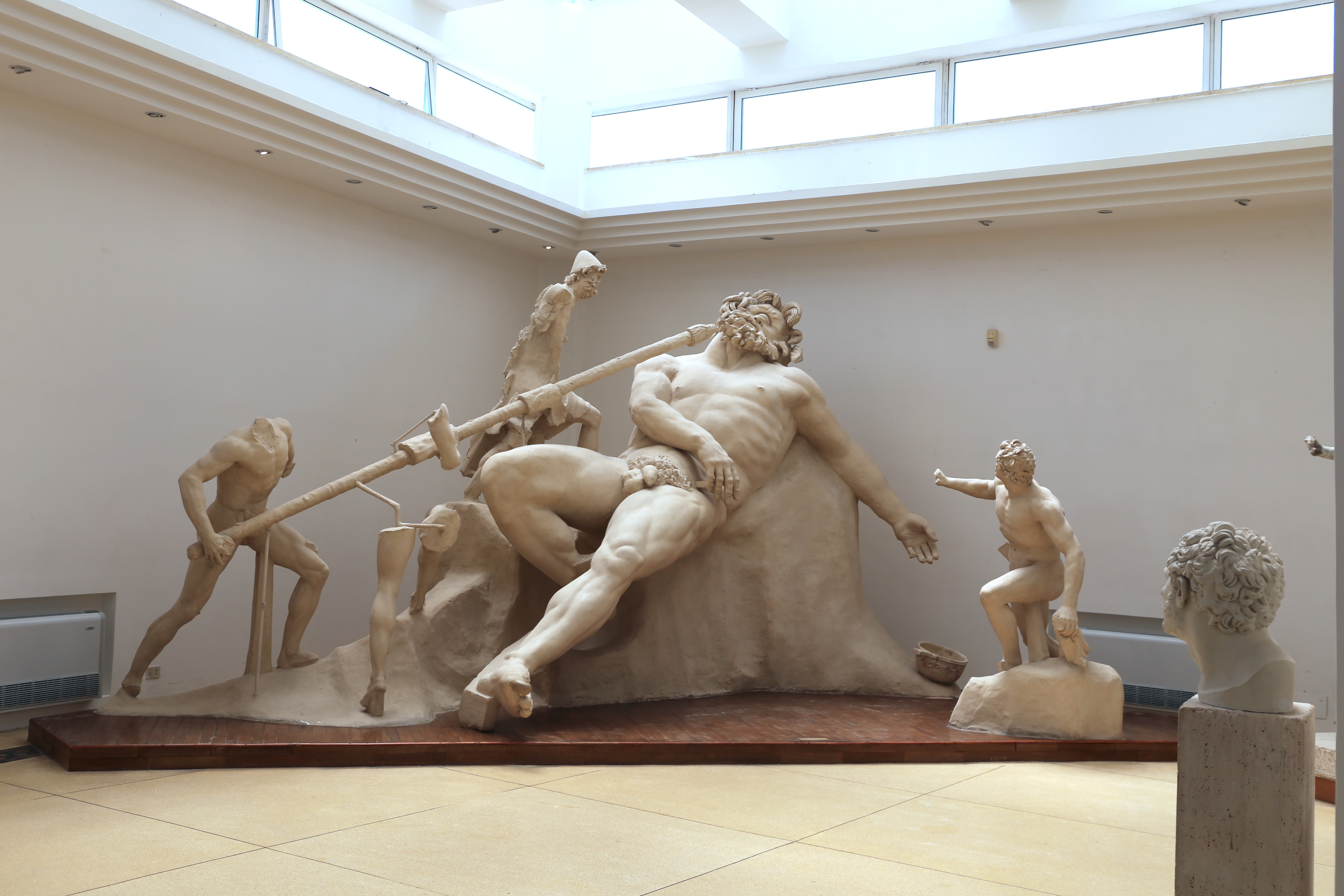
The central group of the Sperlonga sculptures, with the Blinding of Polyphemus

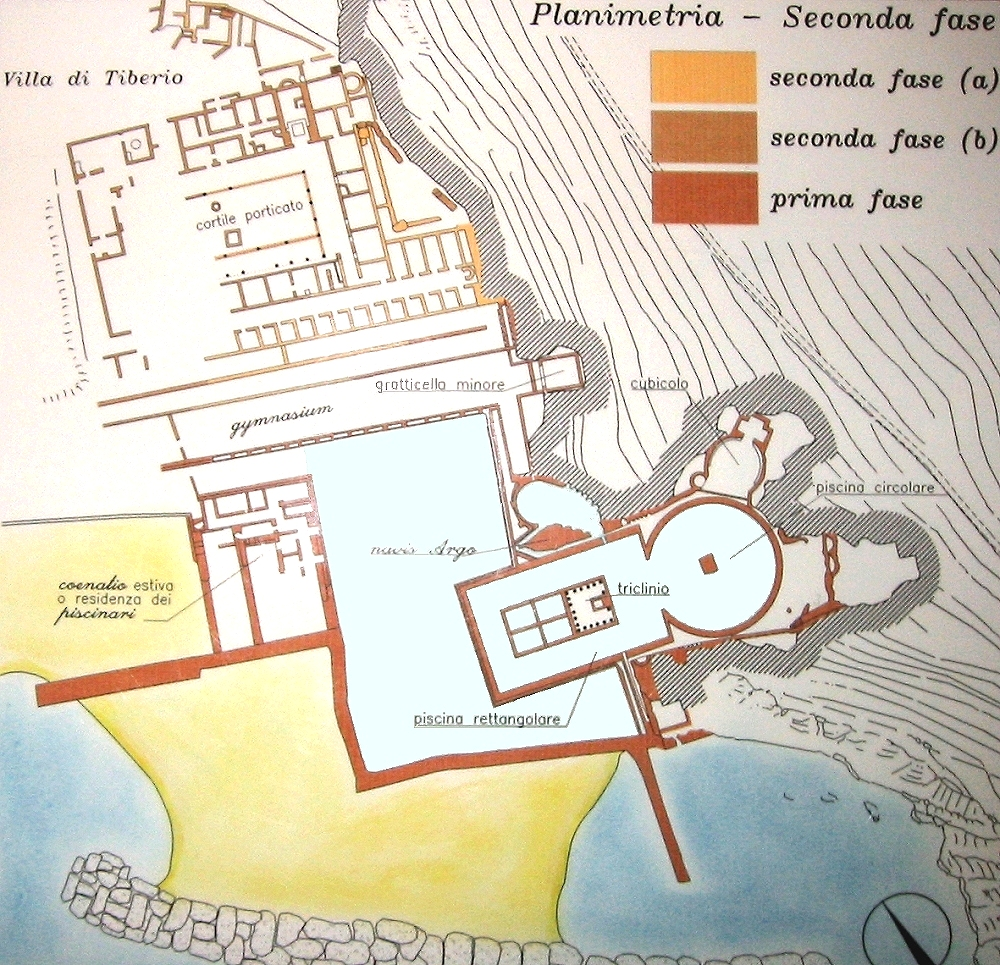
Map of Villa of Tiberius.

Sperlonga's main cultural attraction is the museum erected in the grounds of the former Villa of Tiberius showing the groups of sculpture found in the grotto celebrating the deeds of Odysseus. According to Tacitus and Suetonius, the roof of the grotto collapsed while Tiberius was dining, and Sejanus rushed to save Tiberius, for which Tiberius in gratitude promoted him, launching his rise to power. Tiberius moved to Capri after 26 AD.

The villa included a grotto where some sculptures, now housed in the museum, have been found: these portrayed the assault of Scylla to Odysseus' ship, the blinding of Polyphemus, the theft of the Palladium and Odysseus lifting Achilles's corpse. The works have been attributed to Rhodian sculptors Agesander, Athenedoros and Polydoros, and are thought to be the same authors of the group of "Laocoön and His Sons" (as attributed by Pliny the Elder). Yet whether the very same artists are responsible is questionable. Some scholars believe them to be related, but not the same people; apart from Athenedoros (II) who was the last to be credited as an artist on the Laocoon group, but first to be credited with the Scylla series – suggesting that he was the youngest during the creation of the Laocoon group, but eldest artist who worked on the Scylla group. Furthermore, the differentiation in 'classicism' between the two sets of works implies that one preceded the other with separation, and thus that not all artists are the same people, but descendants.

== Other sights ==
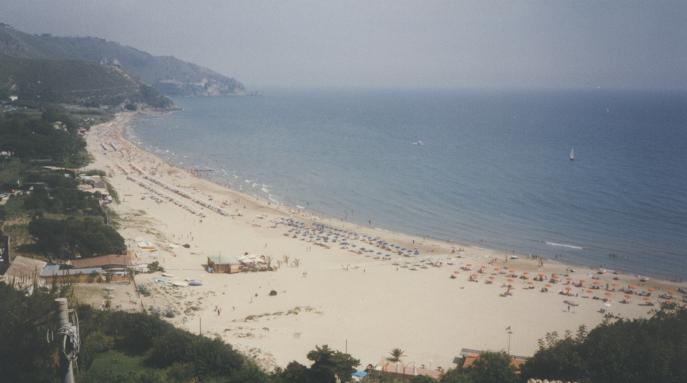
The beach of Sperlonga.

The most ancient church is that of Santa Maria (early 12th century), currently used for cultural events and spectacles: it is home to some mediaeval mosaics discovered during the last restorations.

The Truglia Tower, a historic coastal watchtower, is located on the tip of the headland where Sperlonga is also situated.

Sperlonga is mostly a tourist town thanks to its beaches, a long beach on its west side going all the way to Terracina, and a series of short beaches and rocky cliffs on its east side towards Gaeta.

== Transport ==
The main connection is that by road from Terracina and Gaeta. The nearest railways station is that of Fondi-Sperlonga, on one of the two Rome-Naples main lines (the one going via Formia).

== Twin towns ==
- Aubière, France
