= Auto mechanic =

Occupation

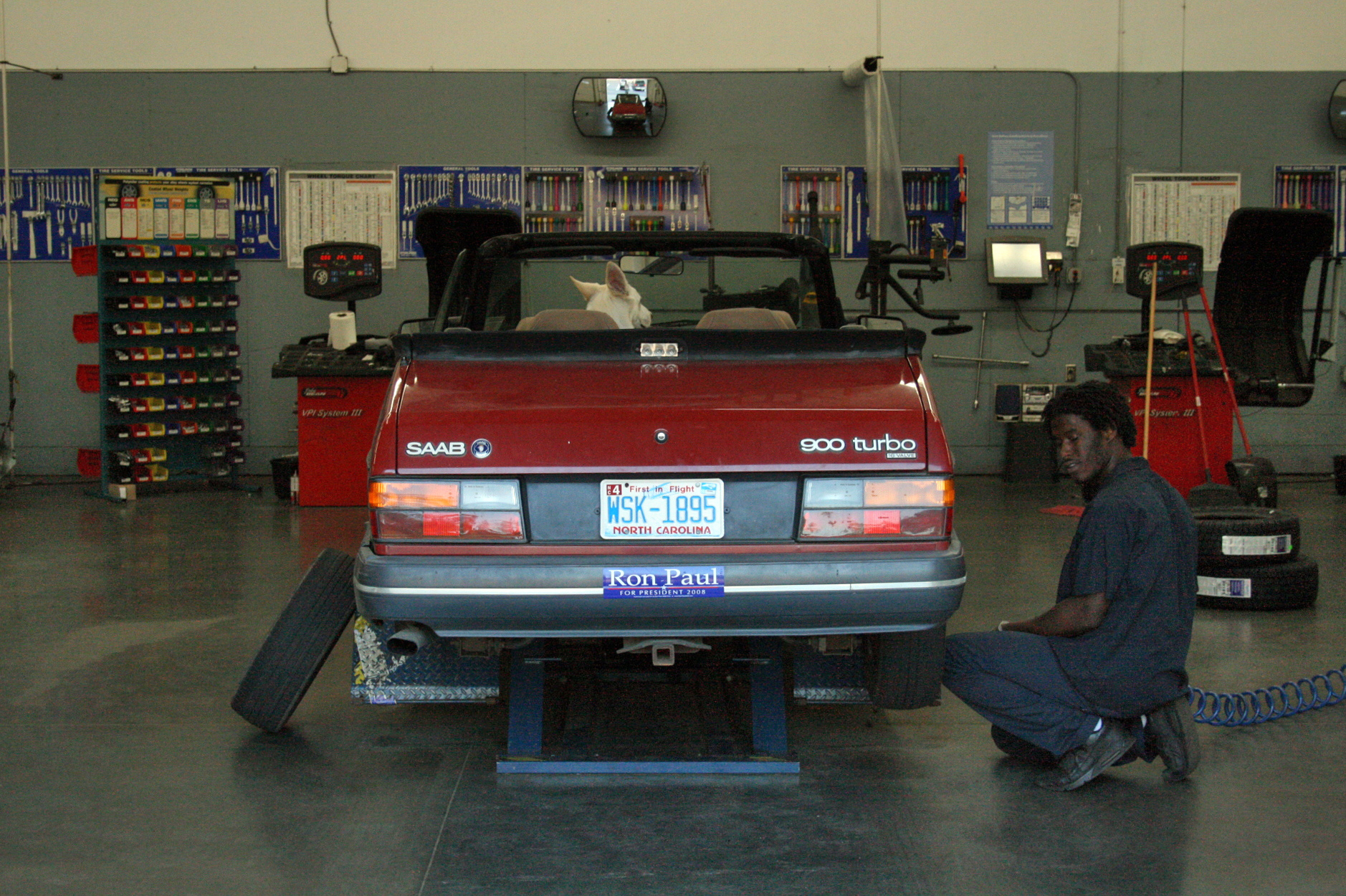
- An auto mechanic of Sam's Club service garage putting on new tires on a Saab 900 Turbo

Occupation
- Names: Auto mechanic
- Occupation type: Skilled trades
- Activity sectors: Automobile

Description
- Education required: Apprenticeship, in addition to training once hired; some mechanics may take vocational or community college courses in certain areas such as heating and air conditioning, engine and transmission maintenance, and collision repair; further education and training could lead to becoming a supervisor or manager, or with a baccalaureate or graduate degree, an automotive engineer or design specialist.
- Related jobs: Motorcycle mechanic, Diesel mechanic

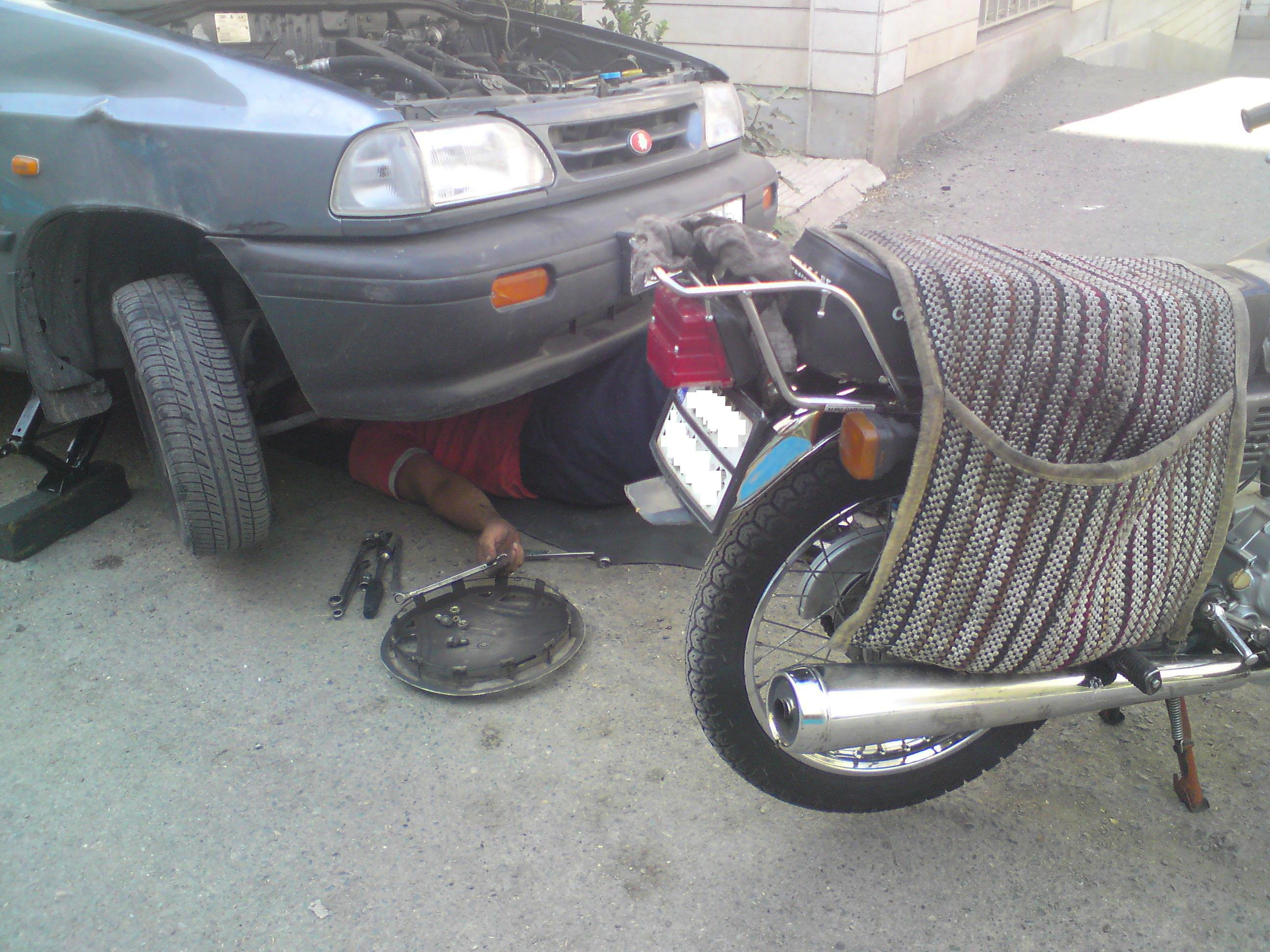
A mobile auto mechanic in Iran

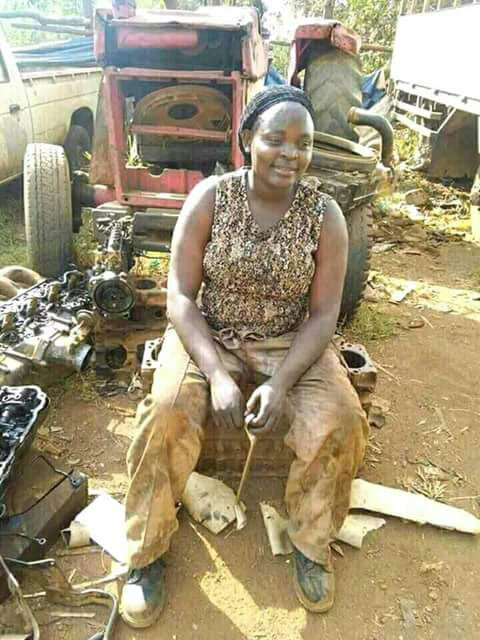
An auto mechanic at a garage in Kenya.

An auto mechanic is a mechanic who services and repairs automobiles, sometimes specializing in one or more automobile brands or sometimes working with any brand. In fixing cars, their main role is to diagnose and repair the problem accurately. Seasoned auto repair shops start with a (Digital) Inspection to determine the vehicle conditions, independent of the customers concern. Based on the concern, the inspection results and preventative maintenance needs, the mechanic/technician returns the findings to the service advisor who then gets approval for any or all of the proposed work. The approved work will be assigned to the mechanic on a work order. Their work may involve the repair of a specific part or the replacement of one or more parts as assemblies. Basic vehicle maintenance is a fundamental part of a mechanic's work in modern industrialized countries, while in others they are only consulted when a vehicle is already showing signs of malfunction.

== Education ==
Automotive repair knowledge can be derived from on-the-job training, an apprenticeship program, vocational school or college.

=== Apprenticeship ===
Apprentice mechanics work under master mechanics for a specified number of years before they work on their own. Some areas have formal apprenticeship programs, however many automotive repair shops utilize an informal apprenticeship system within their facilities. A master mechanic is often encouraged to train an apprentice by earning additional wages from the work produced by the apprentice.

=== Secondary education ===
In the United States, many programs and schools offer training for those interested in pursuing competencies as automotive mechanics or technicians. Areas of training include automobile repair and maintenance, collision repair, painting and restoring, electronics, air-conditioning and heating systems, and truck and diesel mechanics. The National Automotive Technicians Education Foundation (NATEF) is responsible for evaluating training programs against standards developed by the automotive industry. NATEF accredits programs in four different categories: automotive, collision, trucks (diesel technology) and alternative fuels. Diesel mechanics have developed into a trade somewhat distinctive from gasoline-engine mechanics. NATEF lists secondary and post secondary schools with accredited programs on their website.

== Skill level and certifications ==
It is common for automotive repair companies to assign skill levels to their employed professionals so that each repair can be appropriately matched to a qualified professional. Some use an alphabetical ranking system whereby an upper-level is referred to as an "A tech" and a lower-level as a "C tech." Diagnosis and drivability concerns tend to be upper-level jobs while maintenance and component replacement are lower-level jobs. A professional's skill level is usually determined by years of experience and certifications:

=== OEM ===
A vehicle's Original Equipment Manufacturer (OEM) often provides and requires additional training as part of the dealership franchise agreement. In doing so, professionals become specialized and certified for that particular vehicle make. Some vocational schools or colleges offer manufacturer training programs with certain vehicle brands including BMW, Ford, GM, Mercedes-Benz, Mopar, Porsche, Toyota and Volvo which can provide a professional with OEM training before entering the dealership environment. These types of programs may be paid for by a student with no obligation, or by the manufacturer with a contract that requires a professional to work for the OEM for a designated amount of time upon graduating. An OEM usually has multiple professional skill levels that can be achieved, but the Master status is typically one of them.

=== EPA ===
The United States Environmental Protection Agency (EPA) requires any person who repairs or services a motor vehicle air conditioning system for payment or bartering to be properly trained and certified under section 609 of the Clear Air Act. To be certified, professionals must be trained by an EPA-approved program and pass a test demonstrating their knowledge in these areas. This certification does not expire.

== Types and specialties ==
=== Auto body ===
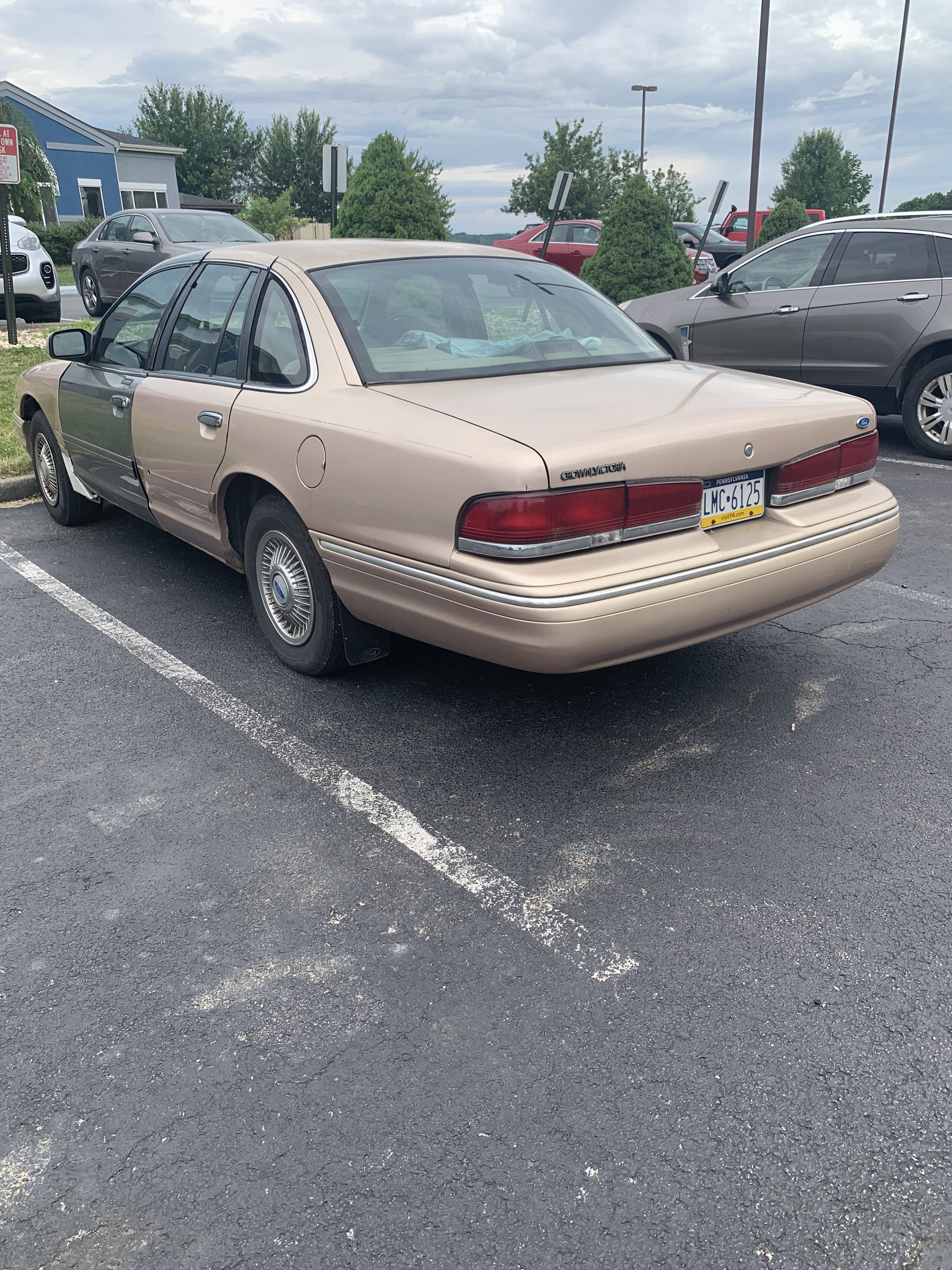
A 1995 Ford Crown Victoria that has had a door replaced.

An auto body technician repairs the exterior of a vehicle, primarily bodywork and paintwork. This includes repairing minor damages such as scratches, scuffs and dents, as well as major damage caused by vehicle collisions. Some specialized auto body technicians may also offer paintless dent repair, glass replacement and chassis straightening.

=== Auto glass ===
An auto glass repairs chips, cracks and shattered glass in windshields, quarter glass, side windows and rear glass. Glass damage is often caused by hail, stones, wild animals, fallen trees, automobile theft and vandalism. Depending on the type and severity of the damage, an auto glass may either repair or replace the affected glass.

=== Diesel ===
A diesel mechanic repairs diesel engines, often found in trucks and heavy equipment.

=== Exhaust specialist ===
An exhaust system specialist performs repairs to the engine exhaust system. These mechanics utilize large tubing benders and welders to fabricate a new exhaust system out of otherwise straight lengths of pipe.

=== Fleet ===
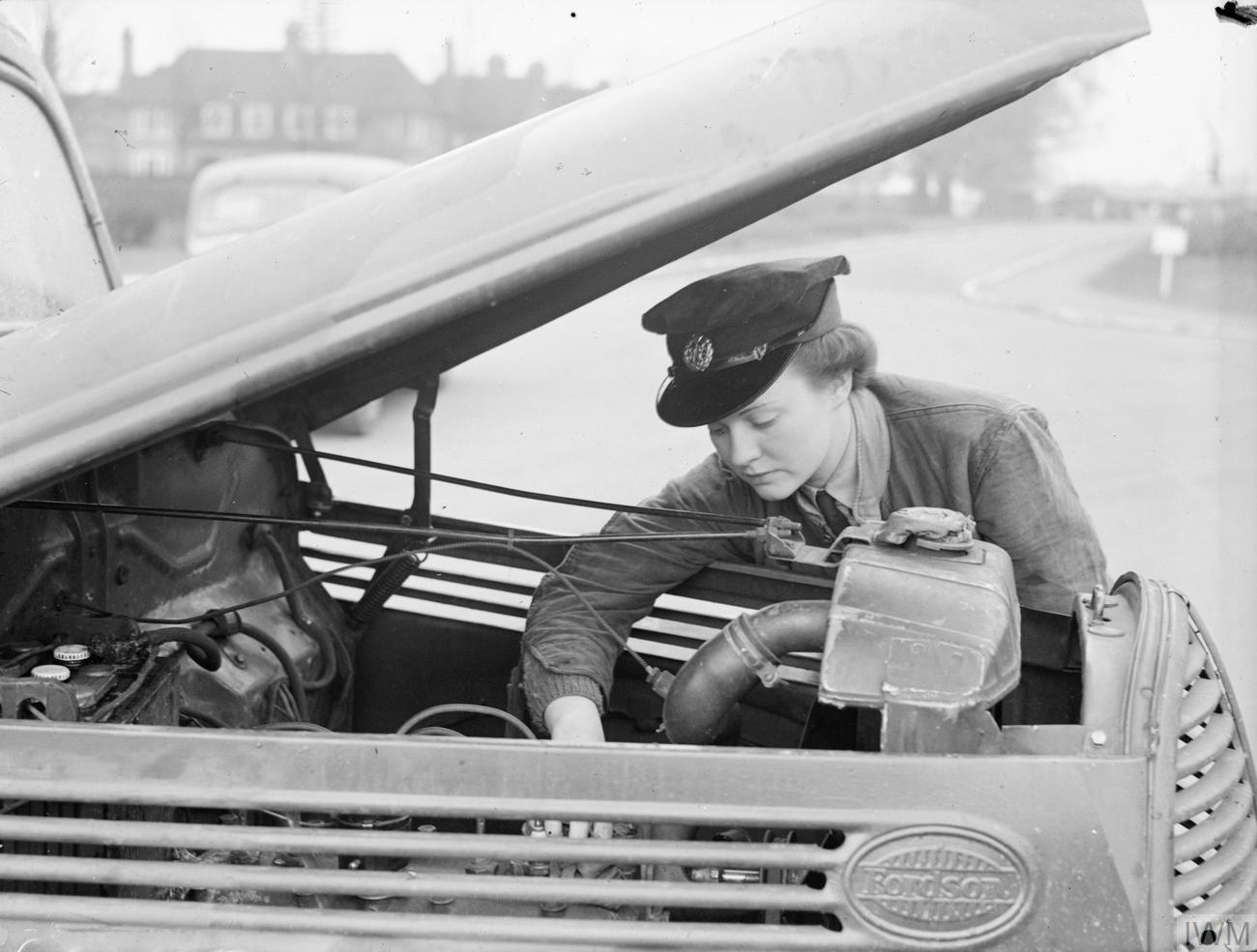
A trainee inspecting the engine of a fleet vehicle during World War II

A fleet mechanic maintains a particular group of vehicles called a fleet. Common examples of a fleet include taxi cabs, police cars, mail trucks and rental vehicles. Similar to a lubrication professional, a fleet mechanic focuses primarily on preventative maintenance and safety inspections, and will often outsource larger or more complex repairs to another repair facility.

=== General repair ===
A general repair professional diagnoses and repairs electrical and mechanical vehicle systems including (but not limited to) brakes, driveline, starting, charging, lighting, engine, HVAC, supplemental restraints, suspension and transmission systems. Some general repair professionals are only capable or certified for select systems, while master professionals (generally speaking) are capable or certified across all vehicle systems.

=== Heavy line ===
A heavy line mechanic performs major mechanical repairs such as engine or transmission replacement. Some heavy line mechanics also perform overhaul procedures for these components.

=== Lubrication ===
A lubrication professional, often shortened to lube tech, is an entry-level position that focuses on basic preventive maintenance services rather than repairs. The tasks that can be performed are typically limited to automotive fluid, filter, belt, hose replacement and often times tire maintenance. Lube techs are employed by nearly every type of automotive repair shop, however, they are most prevalent in quick lube or express service shops because they lower business overhead resulting in a less expensive service as compared to traditional automotive workshops.

=== Mobile ===
A mobile professional performs most of the same repairs as a general repair professional, except does so at the customer's location rather than inside a brick and mortar facility.

=== Pit crew ===
A pit crew mechanic performs an assigned maintenance or repair task to a racecar during a pit stop along a racetrack. Pit crew jobs include raising and lowering the vehicle with a jack, filling the car with gasoline, changing the tires, and cleaning the windshield. Although these are basic tasks, they must be performed in an extremely quick and accurate fashion.

== Challenges ==
=== Physical ===
The auto mechanic has a physically demanding job, often exposed to loud noises, equipment, slippery surfaces, vehicle parts, tools, falling objects, fires, explosions, and more. Musculoskeletal disorders are common for mechanics because of the manual handling and awkward positions required for the occupation. Cuts and piercings are the most frequent injury types and the upper body and hand are the most common body regions for discomfort. Government organizations have developed industry standards to reduce mechanics’ risk of physical hazards. The Occupational Safety and Health Administration's general standards address the physical hazards that may appear in workplace settings and how to avoid them properly. The United Kingdom’s Health and Safety Executive has also published a detailed book for health and safety in motor vehicle repair. These resources emphasize the importance of PPE (personal protective equipment), manual handling devices, and a clean workplace for reducing the risk of physical harm.

=== Chemical ===
Auto mechanics may also deal with exposure to toxic chemicals and materials. Common chemical and material exposures for auto mechanics can include engine exhaust, solvents, dust as a result of sanding or abrasive blasting, spray from paints, cleaning products, and asbestos from brake and clutch repair. As a result of these exposures, auto mechanics can face increased risks for developing mesothelioma, bladder, digestive, lung, and pancreatic cancers, as well as heart disease and other cardiovascular disorders. There are a number of methods for reducing the exposure of auto mechanics to these harmful chemicals and materials. Proper knowledge and use of PPE can reduce exposure, and it is critical that auto mechanics receive workplace training that emphasizes the importance of PPE. Workplaces with auto mechanics should also create a hazard communication program in order to protect their employees from chemical exposures. Additionally, auto mechanic workplaces should have regular testing done in order to ensure that there is both proper ventilation and that air contaminant levels are safe and conducive to reducing overall worker exposure. Respirators can be utilized to reduce exposure from paint spray, and high volume low pressure paint guns should be used in conjunction with downdraft ventilation. This is critical, as paint exposure can lead to nervous disorders, skin and eye irritation, asthma, and a reduction in lung function. Similarly, exposure to dust from sanding can be effectively reduced by the use of ventilated sanders, which reduce the concentration of dust produced from sanding.

=== Technological ===
With the rapid advancement in technology, the mechanic's job has evolved from purely mechanical, to include electronic technology. Because vehicles today possess complex computer and electronic systems, mechanics often need to have a broader base of knowledge than in the past and be prepared to learn these new technologies and systems.

=== Financial ===
Automotive professionals utilize many tools, equipment and reference material to perform their duties. While equipment and reference materials are typically provided by the employer, all other tools are purchased, owned, and provided by the professional.

== Resources ==
=== Scan tool ===
Due to the increasingly labyrinthine nature of the technology that is now incorporated into automobiles, most automobile dealerships and independent workshops now provide sophisticated diagnostic computers to each professional, without which they would be unable to diagnose or repair a vehicle.

=== Reference material ===
The internet is being applied to the field increasingly often, with mechanics providing advice on-line. Mechanics themselves now regularly use the internet for information to help them in diagnosing and/or repairing vehicles. Paper based service manuals for vehicles have become significantly less prevalent with computers that are connected to the Internet taking their position, giving quick access to a plethora of technical manuals and information.

=== Online scheduling ===
Online appointment platforms have surged allowing customers to schedule vehicle repairs by making appointments. A newer method of mobile mechanic services has emerged where the online appointment made by a person seeking repairs turns into a dispatch call and the mechanics travel to the customers location to perform the services.

== Related careers ==
A mechanic usually works from the workshop in which the (well equipped) mechanic has access to a vehicle lift to access areas that are difficult to reach when the car is on the ground. Beside the workshop bound mechanic, there are mobile mechanics like those of the UK Automobile Association (the AA) which allow the car owner to receive assistance without the car necessarily having to be brought to a garage.

A mechanic may opt to engage in other careers related to his or her field. Teaching of automotive trade courses, for example, is almost entirely carried out by qualified mechanics in many countries.

There are several other trade qualifications for working on motor vehicles, including panel beater, spray painter, body builder and motorcycle mechanic. In most developed countries, these are separate trade courses, but a qualified tradesperson from one sphere can change to working as another. This usually requires that they work under another tradesperson in much the same way as an apprentice.

Auto body repair involves less work with oily and greasy parts of vehicles, but involves exposure to particulate dust from sanding bodywork and potentially toxic chemical fumes from paint and related products. Salespeople and dealers often also need to acquire an in-depth knowledge of cars, and some mechanics are successful in these roles because of their knowledge. Auto mechanics also need to stay updated with all the leading car companies as well as newly launched cars. Mechanics have to study continuously on new technology engines and their work systems.

== See also ==
- Automotive restoration and scrapping
- Exhaust gas analyzer
- Service (motor vehicle)
- Jerry Truglia, automotive instructor and author
- List of automotive tools and equipment
