= Service Labor Time Standards =

Service Labor Time Standards (SLTS) are used by automotive manufacturers to determine the time required to repair a particular malfunctioning part on one of their automobiles.

The SLTS is the benchmark for other aftermarket repair facilities to determine how much to charge customers when they have their vehicle repaired. These times were all in theory determined by actual disassembly and reassembly of the affected part(s). Using several workers, disassembly and reassembly times were taken, and an average was established. Times for retrieving the automobile, diagnosing the concern, retrieving the part(s) from the parts department, and a test drive if necessary were included to fully establish the SLTS. An experienced automotive technician could repair a vehicle faster than a technician that has minimal experience and must consult with the manual to properly diagnose and repair the same concern.
