= Truglia Tower =

- Torre Truglia (Italian)
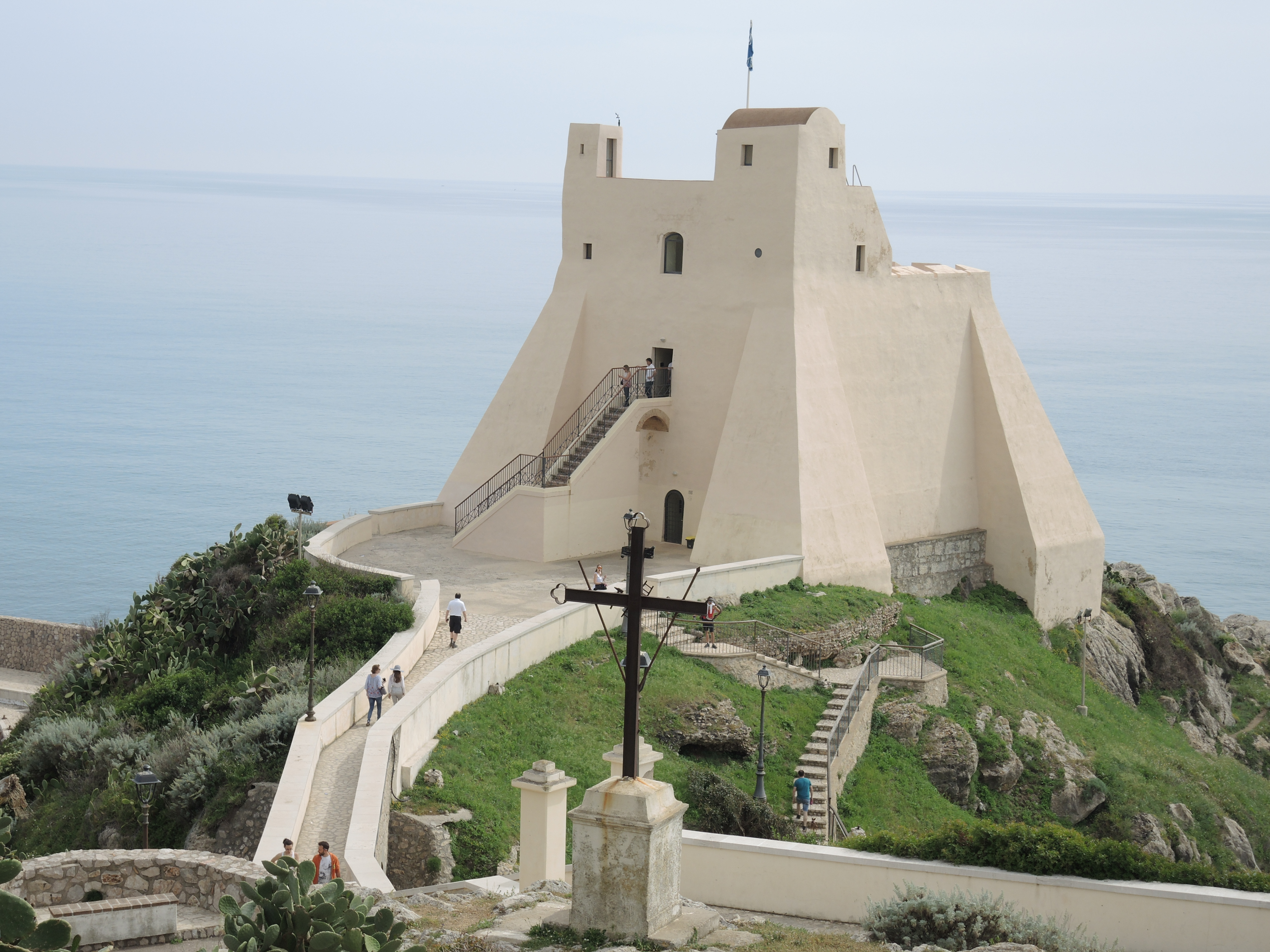
- Truglia Tower in Sperlonga
- Click on the map for a fullscreen view

General information
- Location: Sperlonga, Italy
- Coordinates: 41°15′16.14″N 13°26′01.88″E

The Truglia Tower (Italian: Torre Truglia) is a historic coastal tower in Sperlonga, Italy.

== History ==
It is assumed that the tower was built in 1532 on the remains of a previous Roman watchtower. After being destroyed by the corsair Barbarossa on August 8, 1534, it was rebuilt in 1535 as part of a wide campaign of Charles V, Holy Roman Emperor to protect the coast of Italy.

Documentation of the tower is available from 1611, when the tower hosted a garrison of soldiers under command of one corporal Benedetto Veltrano. The tower was again invaded by the Turks in 1623.

In 1690 the tower was described:

"at the tip of the rock, which protrudes above the sea, is the watchtower called Truglio: a tower with three pieces of iron with two snap-hooks, inhabited by a soldier and in the summer by another added by the University."

Restorations of the tower were carried out in the beginning of the 21st century and completed in 2009.

== Description ==
The building is located on the tip of the headland where the village of Sperlonga stands, overlooking the Gulf of Gaeta. The tower has a quadrilateral plan with four corner buttresses.
