= Pharma Documentation Ring =

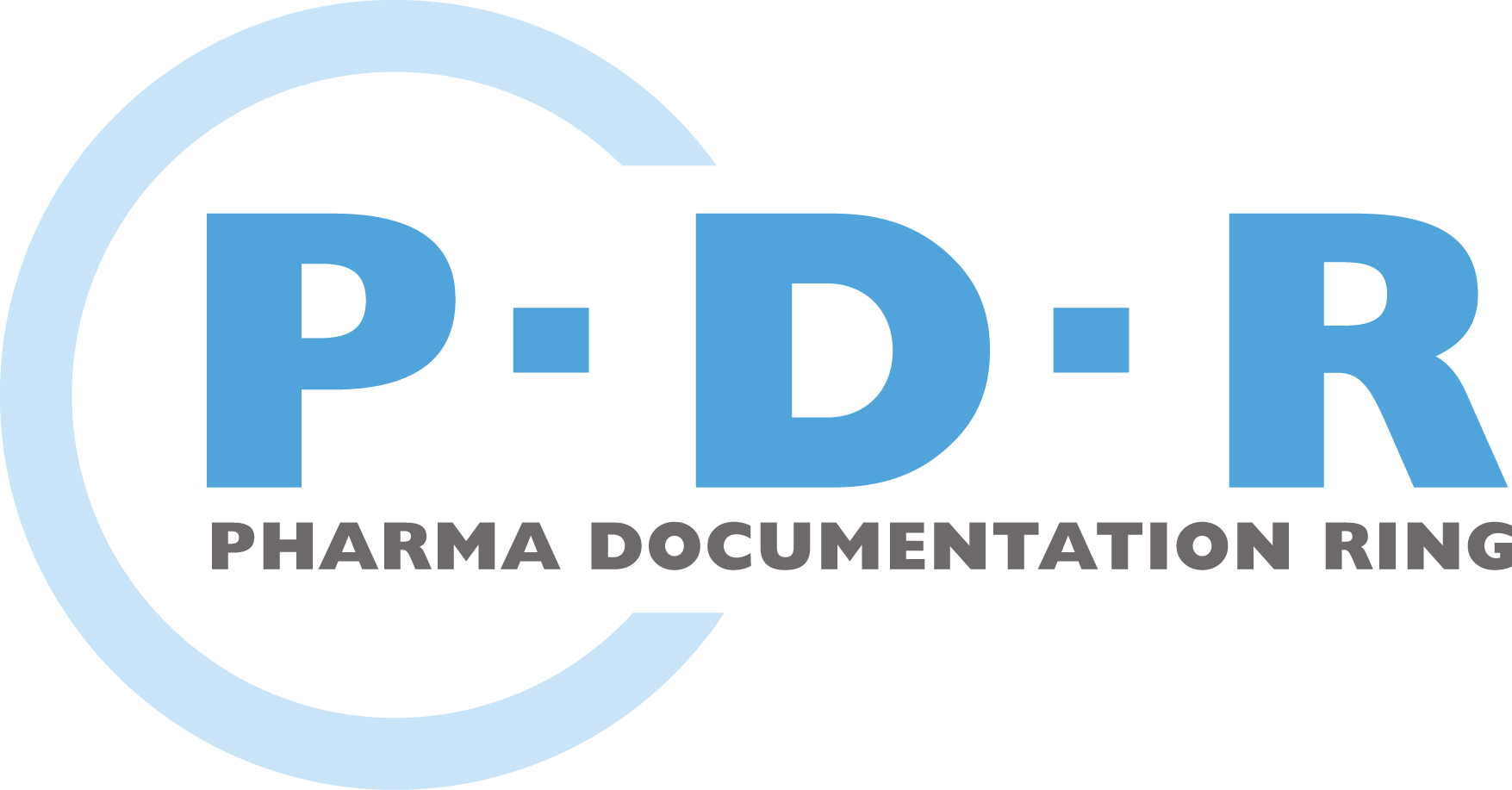
- Formation: 1958
- Type: Think tank
- Legal status: Non-profit
- President
- Website: Official website

The Pharma Documentation Ring (P-D-R), founded in 1958, is a think tank of information and knowledge-management professionals representing major research-based pharmaceutical companies. The association has four aims:

- Promote exchange of knowledge among members
- Encourage commercial development of new information services and systems
- Jointly assess new and existing products and services
- Provide a forum for the information industry

== History ==
One of P-D-R's initial aims was to select and index relevant documents from the scientific literature, to write abstracts and index them based on agreed rules, and to distribute copies of the corresponding punched cards and microfilms to all cooperating members. Due to the limited space on a punched card, the P-D-R-affiliated companies developed fragment codes for chemical structures and biomedical terms allowing them to index all relevant aspects of the publications properly. The Ringcode was born and survived for several decades, even replacing more sophisticated techniques.

In 1964, this biomedical literature documentation activity was licensed to the British company, Derwent Publications (currently Thomson Reuters), and the service succeeded as Ringdoc (now Derwent Drug File). Ten years later, P-D-R's chemical reaction coding system was also transferred to Derwent Publications; this evolved as Chemical Reactions Documentation Services. Both services continued to be developed further in cooperation with P-D-R-affiliated companies and new members of the network.

During the 1970s, P-D-R saw gradual growth, becoming more international, continuing to process patents using its Ringcode until 1978. In the 1980s, a new focal point was found for P-D-R, where it began to place an emphasis on exchanging experience and testing commercial systems and databases of interest to the pharmaceutical industry.

P-D-R has, as of 2023, more than 29 member companies from Europe, the US, Japan, and Australia. There is no membership fee, however members must commit to contribute, by participating in meetings, work groups and task forces.

== Administration ==
The governance of the association is achieved by its annual general meeting (AGM) hosted by a member company; an executive board usually operating with 6 members, itself elected by the AGM for two years; and a number of workstreams which work continuously on their respective topics of interest throughout the year.

John Aubrey is the current president.

== Special meetings ==
Special meetings were started in the late 1990s and worked on topics such as intranets, e-journals, the integrated information world, linking, copyright, taxonomy, and text mining. These meetings were held separately from the AGMs, as more people were invited to attend, including vendors and suppliers who were active in these fields.

After the e-journal special meeting in 1998, a task force was established to work on a set of standard licensing terms for e-journals. During the course of three years and via collaboration between P-D-R, the Association of Learned and Professional Society Publishers, and the International Association of Scientific, Technical, and Medical Publishers, the STM/P-D-R sample licence for journals supplied in electronic form was launched in 2000. Later revisions followed, and included the "Medical Information Clause".

Special meetings about usage rights in the context of text mining were held in 2009 and 2011. As a consequence, a task force was established to work on the licensing issues for text mining content. The P-D-R sample licence was subsequently amended to grant text and data-mining rights for use with the content to which each of the P-D-R members subscribes. The agreement was signed on September 17, 2012. In 2015 a special meeting was held on authentication. A special meeting was planned in 2019: Breaking down the data silos: FAIRification of external data.

== Member companies as of 2024 ==
- AbbVie
- Amgen
- Astellas Pharma
- AstraZeneca
- BASF
- Bayer HealthCare
- Biogen
- Boehringer Ingelheim
- Bristol-Myers Squibb
- Chiesi
- CSL Behring
- Daiichi Sankyo
- Eli Lilly and Company
- Ferring
- Hoffmann-La Roche
- Gilead Sciences
- GlaxoSmithKline
- Merck & Co
- Merck KGaA
- Novartis
- Novo Nordisk
- Organon
- Otsuka
- Pfizer
- Sanofi
- Seagen
- Takeda
- UCB
- Vertex Pharmaceuticals
