= Auto body technician =

Mechanical occupation

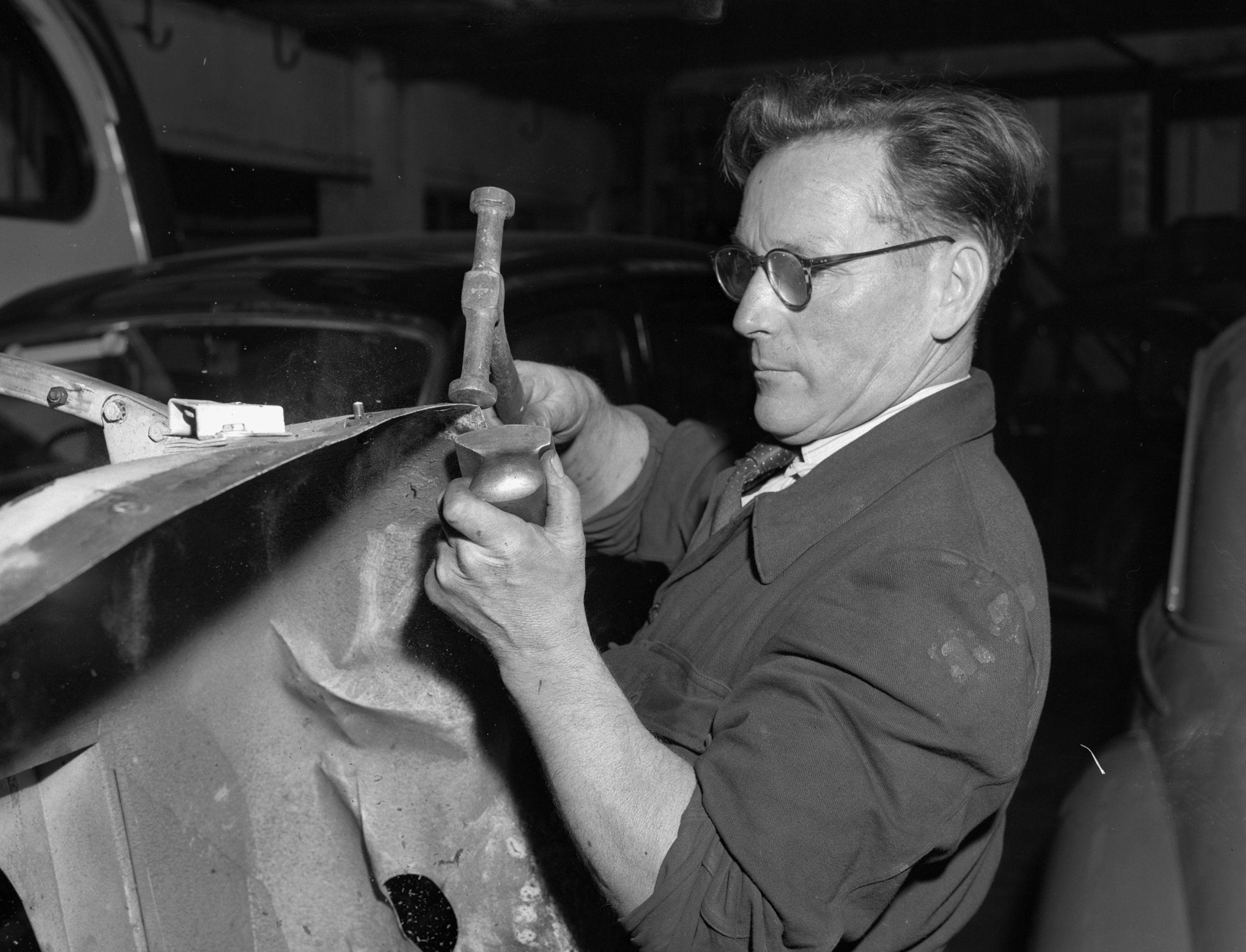
Auto Body Technician Working On A Car.

An auto body technician, automotive body technician, auto body repairer or automotive body repairer is a professional who repairs and refinishes automotive vehicle bodies and straightens vehicle chassis after a vehicle has been in a collision or accident.

Most training is on the job, and in the U.S. technicians may obtain credentials through the National Institute of Automotive Service Excellence.
