= Automotive Service Excellence =

Organization

National Institute for Automotive Service Excellence
- Abbreviation: ASE
- Nickname: Automotive Service Excellence
- Formation: June 12, 1972; 54 years ago
- Founded at: Washington D.C., U.S.
- Type: non-profit organization
- Registration no.: 721570
- Headquarters: Leesburg, Virginia, U.S.
- Location(s): United States and Canada
- Members: 247,621 - Certified service professionals (2018)
- Official language: English
- Website: ase.com

The National Institute for Automotive Service Excellence (ASE) is a professional certification group that certifies professionals and shops in the automotive repair and service industry in the United States and parts of Canada. It is an independent, nonprofit organization created in 1972 in response to consumers needing to distinguish between potentially incompetent and competent automotive technicians. The organization aims to improve the quality of vehicle repair and service through the testing and certification of repair and service professionals.

== ASE certification ==
ASE offers certification tests for automotive professionals through Prometric Test Centers. These involve several exams, the passing of which, added with two years of relevant hands-on work experience, will merit certification. The required experience can be substituted by one year of on-the-job training and a two-year training degree. A recertification track is also offered for those who have had previous certification. Upon certification, the certified applicant will also receive an ASE shoulder insignia, wallet I.D. card and a wall certificate suitable for framing. As of January 2020 the wallet card is again available after being retired since June 2016.

ASE certification is usually required by employers for those interested in pursuing a career in professional automotive service. Some municipalities require ASE certification in order to be licensed for motor vehicle repairs, such as Broward and Miami-Dade counties of Florida.

== Student certifications and entry-level testing ==
ASE also offers an Entry-Level Certification Program aimed at high school and postsecondary students enrolled in automotive training programs. These assessments measure foundational knowledge in core areas such as brakes, steering and suspension, electrical/electronic systems, and maintenance and light repair. Unlike traditional ASE certifications, these exams are not pass/fail but instead recognize student achievement through performance-based criteria. The Entry-Level Certification Program is widely implemented in career and technical education (CTE) settings to support workforce readiness and skill development.

To assist with preparation, students and instructors commonly use platforms such as the Automotive Student Testing website, which offers practice exams and diagnostic tools aligned with ASE standards. These resources are especially useful for those pursuing the G1 Maintenance and Light Repair certification. Research shows that early exposure to ASE certification contributes to improved technical confidence and career awareness among students.

== Blue Seal of Excellence Recognition Program ==
ASE also administers the Blue Seal of Excellence Recognition Program, which acknowledges repair facilities that demonstrate a high level of commitment to professional certification. To qualify, a business must have at least 75% of its service personnel ASE-certified, and each area of service offered must be covered by at least one ASE-certified technician. This program is intended to help consumers identify shops with verified technical competence and a documented dedication to ongoing professional development.

== See also ==
- Automobile repair shop
- Auto mechanic
