= Paintless dent repair =

Method for removing minor dents from the body of a motor vehicle

Paintless dent repair (PDR), also known as paintless dent removal, describes a method of removing small dents, dings, and minor collision damage (paint unbroken) dents from the body of a motor vehicle. A wide range of damage can be repaired using paintless dent repair as long as the paint surface is intact. Paintless dent repair may be used on both aluminum and steel panels.

Common practical uses for paintless dent repair is the repair of hail damage, door dings, creases, body/feature line dents, and minor collision damage.

The method can also be utilized to prepare a damaged panel for repainting by minimizing the use of body filler. This technique is currently known as "push to paint" or "push to prep". Less is certainly more when it comes to the integrity of damage that is repaired with body filler.

Paintless dent repair can be a very beneficial repair given that the damage qualifies. It can save the factory finish of a vehicle which cannot be replicated nor reproduced. However, PDR does not replace a traditional body repair shop. Factors such as paint damage, stretched metal or an already re-painted panel can inhibit the success of a PDR repair.

Stretched metal is when the impact that created the dent pushes the metal beyond the form it was stamped into. One way to illustrate this is similar to how if one presses a finger into the plastic packaging covering a case of bottled water. If pressed in so that the plastic film stretches inward, but not punctured, a similar effect to that of stretched dents is achieved. There is simply more surface area there than was to start with. While putting that material back is generally unlikely, tech and industry advancements have shown great strides in fixing damage that was previously believed to be irreparable via PDR. Glue pulling, tension methods and power boxes have opened the realm for even deep stretched dents to be repaired to as close to factory spec as possible.

== History ==
Although paintless dent repair recalls repoussé and chasing, which date back to the 3rd century BC, paintless dent removal was started by Frank T. Sargent in 1931, when he wrote a groundbreaking work "The Key To Metal Bumping". This book describes the tools of paintless dent repair, how to use them, and even gives illustrations on how one might predict the metal to move.

Almost 30 years later Oskar Flaig made the first public display on record, in February 1960 during the "International Motor Sports Show" in New York City, USA.

Oskar Flaig was an ordinary member of staff at Mercedes-Benz. His job was to take care of the paintwork of all the show cars presented at trade fairs. Damage, scratches on the paintwork and small dents, produced by the public during the day, needed to be re-painted at night, so the vehicles would be in perfect condition the next day. At the trade fair in New York City, Oskar Flaig used a hammer handle to push out a small dent, so he would need to apply less filler before painting. Nevertheless, the result already looked perfect after pushing. After the show, Flaig returned home to Germany and started developing techniques and tools to repair dents. He was eventually promoted to foreman at the Mercedes Sindelfingen plant where he was known as the “golden tinsmith” and started PDR training programs at all branch plants. These techniques were used in Germany for a long time before finally being promoted as a successful way to repair dents in the United States in 1979-1983 when Juergen Holzer moved from Germany to Minneapolis, Minnesota and started Dent Kraft (the first recorded business in the United States to use paintless dent repair).

In other forms of metal working, similar techniques of paintless dent removal may have been employed as early as the 1930s in automotive assembly plants.

== Techniques ==
The most common PDR techniques utilize metal rods and body picks to push out the dents from the underside of the body panel. Glue and specially designed tabs may be used to pull out the dents from the outside of the panel.

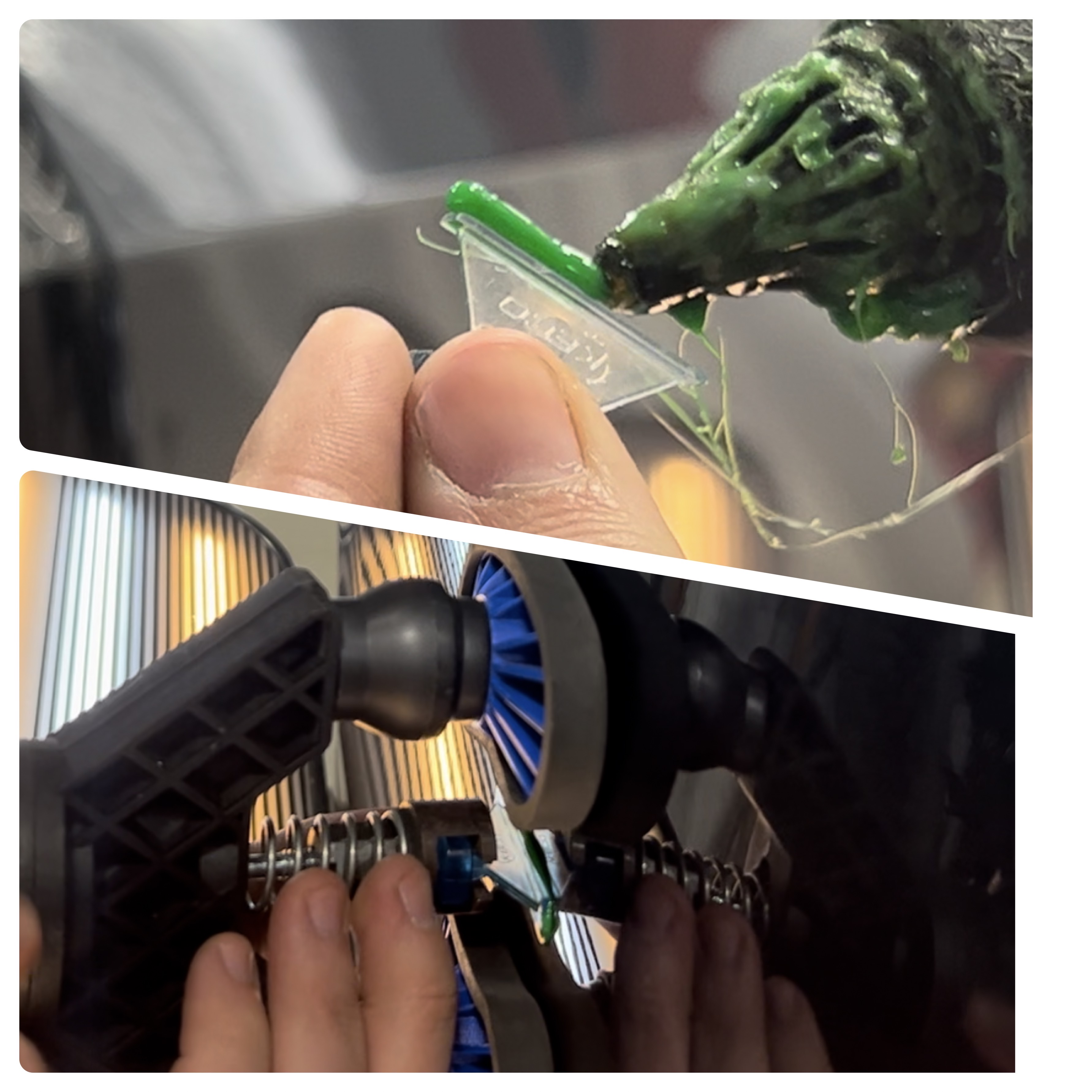
Glue pulling technique using a small crease tab and dent puller

Fine tuning the repair often involves tapping down the repair to remove small high spots. Technicians can blend in high ridges and relieve pressure using light hammers with non-marring hammer heads. Cracking or chipping can be avoided with the use of heat, although a re-painted surface has a greater likelihood of cracking. There is also a greater chance of pulling paint while glue pulling if the panel does not have its factory finish. This problem stems from body shops being unable to re-create the exact conditions of the vehicle being sprayed at the factory.

Door panel before the dent has been removed

Door panel after repair

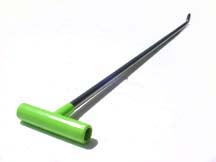
Dent repair tool

== See also ==
- New York International Auto Show
