= Bethanization =

Process patented by the Bethlehem Steel Company

Bethanization is a process patented by the Bethlehem Steel Company to protect steel from corrosion by plating it with zinc, a process similar to electrogalvanization. In advertising materials, Bethlehem Steel claimed the process was more effective than hot dip galvanization, the most common means of using zinc to protect steel.

The process is similar to that of electrolytic sulfuric acid zinc plating, with few differences from bethanization. The electrolytic sulfuric acid zinc plating process uses zinc anodes, while bethanization uses inert mild steel anodes instead. The electrolytes used are manufactured by using zinc oxide dross, and dissolving it in sulfuric acid.

In 1936, Bethlehem Steel spent $30 million (1936 dollars) to build a factory in Johnstown, Pennsylvania capable of creating large amounts of Bethanized wire.

== Material Properties ==
Uniformity - The zinc coating surrounding the wire is tightly bonded to the steel and uniformly distributed; weak spots on the wire will not be found.

Ductility - Bethanizing steel with 99.9 percent zinc, bonds them together tightly without any room for layers of zinc iron alloy. Zinc iron alloy is a brittle substance that induces cracking, leaving steel at critical points exposed. The zinc coating is more ductile and less brittle.

Resistance to corrosion and fatigue - Bethanized wire is claimed to have protection against corrosion and corrosion fatigue equal to that of hot-galvanized steel wire.

Strength - Wire that has been bethanized has breaking strengths claimed to be around 90 percent of bright wire strength.

== Use in fencing ==
Bethanization was applied to outdoor mesh-wire fence by the Bethlehem Steel company in the 1930s. By coating wire with purer zinc, the wire is no longer contaminated with iron unlike previous processes such as galvanization, which the company claims gives wire more durability while still retaining ductility, and also be resistant to sulfur gases that are present in Earth's atmosphere. Other fencing applications that have been bethanized by the Bethlehem Steel Company include:

- Barbed wire
- Gates
- Fence posts
- Bale ties
