= Prepainted metal =

Metal on which a coating material has been applied

According to EN 13523-0, a prepainted metal (or coil coated metal) is a ‘metal on which a coating material (e.g. paint, film…) has been applied by coil coating’. When applied onto the metallic substrate, the coating material (in liquid, in paste or powder form) forms a film possessing protective, decorative and/or other specific properties.

In 40 years, the European prepainted metal production has multiplied by 18.

== Metal ==
The choice of metallic substrate is determined by the dimensional, mechanical and corrosion resistance properties required of the coated product in use. The most common metallic substrates that are organically coated are:

- Hot dip galvanised steel (HDG) which consists of a cold reduced steel substrate onto which a layer of zinc is coated via a hot dip process to impart enhanced corrosion properties onto the base steel.
- Galvanized mild steel (GMS) can be used as balustrade and handrail of staircase, pipe, etc.
- Other zinc-based alloys are coated onto steel and used as a substrate for coil coating, giving different properties. They give improved corrosion resistance in particular conditions.
- Electro-galvanised (EG) coated steel consists of a cold reduced substrate onto which a layer of zinc is coated by an electrolytic process.
- Cold reduced steel (CR) without any zinc coating
- Wrought aluminium alloys
- Many other substrates are organically coated: zinc/iron, stainless steel, tinplate, brass, zinc and copper.

== Coil coating ==
Coil coating is the continuous and highly automated industrial process for efficiently coating metal coils. Because the metal is treated before it is cut and formed, the entire surface is cleaned and treated, providing tightly-bonded finishes. (Formed parts can have many holes, recessed areas, valleys, and hidden areas that make it difficult to clean and uniformly paint.) Coil-coated metal (often called prepainted metal) is often considered more durable and more corrosion-resistant than most post painted metal.

Annually, 4.5 million tons of coil-coated steel and aluminum are produced and shipped in North America, and 5 million tons in Europe. In almost every five-year period since the early 1980s, the growth rate of coil-coated metal has exceeded the growth rates of either steel and/or aluminum production.

=== Process ===
The definition of a coil coating process according to EN 10169:2010 is a ‘process in which an (organic) coating material is applied on rolled metal strip in a continuous process which includes cleaning, if necessary, and chemical pre-treatment of the metal surface and either one-side or two-side, single or multiple application of (liquid) paints or coating powders which are subsequently cured or/and laminating with permanent plastic films’.

The metal substrate (steel or aluminum) is delivered in coil form from the rolling mills. Coil weights vary from 5-6 tons for aluminum and up to about 25 tons for steel. The coil is positioned at the beginning of the line, then unwound at a constant speed, passing through the various pre-treatment and coating processes before being recoiled. Two strip accumulators at the beginning and the end of the line enable the work to be continuous, allowing new coils to be added (and finished coils removed) by a metal stitching process without slowing down or stopping the line.

=== The coil coating line ===
The continuous process of applying up to three separate coating layers onto one or both sides of a metal strip substrate occurs on a coil coating line. These lines vary greatly in size, with widths from 18 to 60 inches (46 to 152 cm) and speeds from 100 to 700 feet per minute (0.5 to 3.6 m/s); however, all coil-coating lines share the same basic process steps.

A typical organic coil coating line consists of decoilers, entry strip accumulator, cleaning, chemical pretreatment, primer coat application, curing, final coat application, curing, exit accumulator and recoilers.

The following steps take place on a modern coating line:

- Mechanical stitching of the strip to its predecessor
- Cleaning the strip
- Power brushing
- Surface treatment by chemical conversion
- Drying the strip
- Application of primer on one or both sides
- Passage through the first curing oven (between 15 and 60 seconds)
- Cooling the strip
- Coating the finish on one or both sides
- Passage through the second curing oven (between 15 and 60 seconds)
- Cooling down to room temperature
- Rewinding of the coated coil

=== Coatings ===
Available coatings include polyesters, plastisols, polyurethanes, polyvinylidene fluorides (PVDF), epoxies, primers, backing coats and laminate films. For each product, the coating is built up in a number of layers.

Primer coatings form the essential link between the pretreatment and the finish coating. Essentially, a primer is required to provide inter-coat adhesion between the pretreatment and the finish coat and is also required to promote corrosion resistance in the total system. The composition of the primer will vary depending on the type of finish coat used. Primers require compatibility with various pretreatments and top coat paint systems; therefore, they usually comprise a mixture of resin systems to achieve this end.

Backing coats are applied to the underside of the strip with or without a primer. The coating is generally not as thick as the finish coating used for exterior applications. Backing coats are generally not exposed to corrosive environments and not visible in the end application.

== Applications ==
Prepainted metal is used in a variety of products. It can be formed for many different applications, including those with T bends, without loss of coating quality. Major industries use prepainted metal in products such as building panels, metal roofs wall panels, garage doors, office furniture (desks, cubicle divider panels, file cabinets, and modular cabinets), home appliances (refrigerators, dishwashers, freezers, range hoods, microwave ovens, and washers and dryers), heating and air-conditioning outer panels and ductwork, commercial appliances, vending machines, foodservice equipment and cooking tins, beverage cans, and automotive panels and parts (fuel tanks, body panels, bumpers), The list continues to grow, with new industries making the switch from post-painted to prepainted processes each year.

Some high-tech, complex coatings are applied with the coil coating process. Coatings for cool metal roofing materials, smog-eating building panels, antimicrobial products, anti-corrosive metal parts, and solar panels use this process. Pretreatments and coatings can be applied with the coil coating process in very precise, thin, uniform layers, and makes some complex coatings feasible and more cost-effective.

The largest market for prepainted metal is in both commercial and residential construction. It is chosen for the quality, low cost, design flexibility, and environmentally beneficial properties. Using prepainted metal can contribute to credit toward LEED certification for sustainable design. A wide arrange of color options are available with prepainted metal, including vibrant colors for modern designs, and natural weathered finishes in rustic expressions. Prepainted metal also can be formed, almost like plastic, in fluid shapes. This flexibility allows architects to achieve unique, expressive designs using metal.

The output of the coil coating industry is a prepainted metal strip. This has numerous applications in various industries, including in:

- The construction industry for both indoor and outdoor applications;
- The automotive and transport industries;
- The production of white goods including washing machines;
- Cabinets for electronic goods;
- Office furniture;
- Lighting envelopes;
- Bakeware.

== History ==
In the old days of traditional manufacturing, steel and other metals arrived at factories in an untreated and unpainted state. Companies would fabricate and paint or treat the metal components of their product before assembly. This was costly, time-consuming, and environmentally harmful. The coil coating process was pioneered in the 1930s for painting, coating and pre-treating large coils of metals before they arrived at a manufacturing facility. The venetian blind industry was the first to utilize pre-painted metal.

== Sources ==
- prepaintedmetal.eu
- prepaintedmetalacademy.eu
- creativebuilding.eu
- creativeroofing.eu
