= Smooth clean surface =

SCS process logo

Roll brushes shown inside the SCS brushing machine

SCS sheet metal processing line

Smooth clean surface (SCS) is a process applied to hot rolled sheet metal and coils to remove nearly all mill scale and clean the steel surface.

The SCS process feeds hot rolled sheet steel, either as individual blanks or as a continuous strip that is uncoiled, into the SCS "brushing machine". Within the machine the steel is passed between sets of rotating roller brushes that spin on an axis perpendicular to the sheet's direction of travel. The roller brush exterior is an engineered abrasive, similar to Scotchbrite, that makes contact with the steel under pressure. Each roller brush spins against the steel at a speed of 900 to 1000 revolutions per minute, "scrubbing away" the outer layers of mill scale – hematite and magnetite – and most of the inner layer, wüstite. The remaining wüstite layer is only a few micrometres thick and highly polished to a smooth surface. Three such roller brushes are typically applied to each surface of the steel sheet, for a total of six roller brushes per SCS brushing machine. Numerous spray nozzles within the brushing machine provide water to rinse the removed scale and any other debris from the steel surface and to cool the friction heat generated in the brushes. The water is filtered and re-used in this closed-loop rinsing/filtering system.

The SCS process imparts a measure of rust resistance to the sheet steel, so that when exposed to a noncondensing atmosphere, its propensity to rust is markedly less than that of hot rolled steel that is not treated with the SCS process. The exact metallurgical phenomenon underlying this transformation of the surface to make it more rust resistant is not fully understood; however, it is theorized that the remaining wüstite layer (chemical symbol FeO) contains a much lower proportion of oxygen than the removed hematite and magnetite layers and is, therefore, more stable and less prone to oxidation when exposed to a noncondensing atmosphere.

The SCS process and its attendant equipment is now paired with a related process, eco pickled surface or EPS. The EPS technology accomplishes a more complete removal of surface oxides than does the SCS process; however, it can also leave the surface with an overall rougher texture, as indicated by Ra or roughness average. The SCS process is applied directly after the EPS process to produce a smoother surface when desired.
