= EPS =

EPS, EPs or Eps may refer to:

== Commerce and finance ==
- Earnings per share
- Electronic Payment Services, in Hong Kong, Macau, and Shenzhen, China
- Express Payment System, in the Philippines

== Education ==
- Edmond Public Schools, Oklahoma, US
- Española Public Schools, New Mexico, US
- Evergreen Public Schools, Washington, US

== Law and military ==
- Edmonton Police Service, Canada
- Sandinista Popular Army (Spanish: Ejército Popular Sandinista), in Nicaragua
- European Protected Species

== Music ==
- Eps (album), a 1999 album by Robert Wyatt
- The EPs (Lacuna Coil album), 2005
- The EPs (Apoptygma Berzerk), EPs recorded by Apoptygma Berzerk
- Ensoniq EPS, a sampler
- George Van Eps (1913-1998), American jazz guitarist
- E.P.S -Eiko PRIMARY SELECTION-, 2011 album by Eiko Shimamiya

== Science and medicine ==
- Extracellular polymeric substance
- Extrapyramidal symptoms
- European Physical Society
- Encapsulating peritoneal sclerosis
- Ensemble Prediction System, used in ensemble forecasting
- Equal probability of selection in statistical sampling methods
- Expressed prostatic secretion, collected by prostate massage
- EPS, an ensemble prediction model run by the European Centre for Medium-Range Weather Forecasts

== Technology ==
- Eco pickled surface, a process applied to hot rolled sheet steel
- Electric power steering
- Electromagnetic parking sensor
- Elizabeth's Percentage System, a mathematical formula for sizing garments
- EUMETSAT Polar System, a satellite system
- Expanded polystyrene
- External power supply

=== Computing ===
- Encapsulated PostScript, a graphics file format
- Entry-Level Power Supply Specification, a computer power supply
- Evolved Packet System, a telecommunications system
- Machine epsilon

== Transportation ==
- Epsom railway station, Surrey, England, by National Rail station code
- European Passenger Services, a former division of British Rail

== Other uses ==
- Abbreviation of episodes, e.g. in TV or radio
- Eps, Pas-de-Calais, France
- Economists for Peace and Security, US organization
- Edappadi K. Palaniswami, former Chief Minister of Tamil Nadu
- Elektroprivreda Srbije, the electric power utility of Serbia
- Espoon Palloseura, a men's association football club in Espoo, Finland
- European Political Science, a journal
- Evangelical Philosophical Society
