= Sendzimir process =

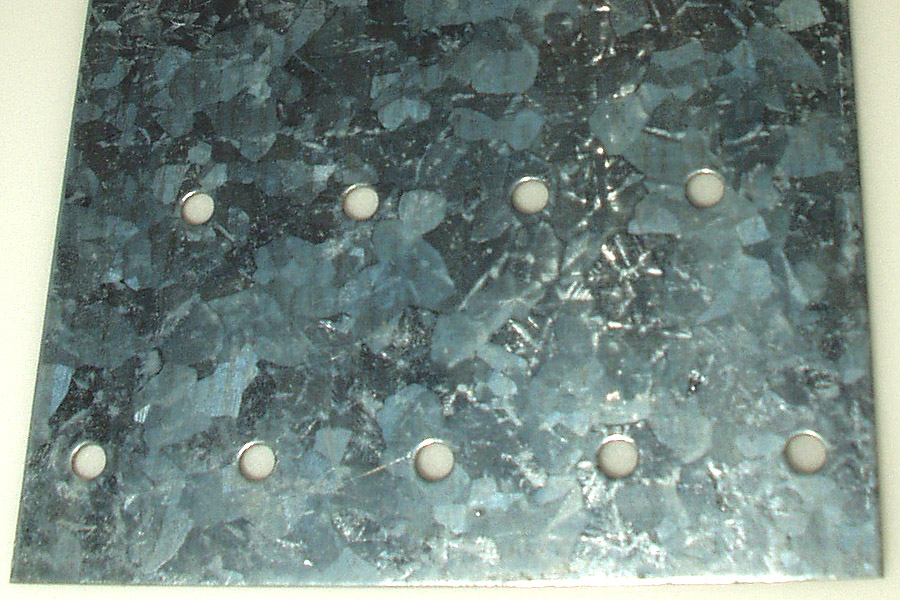
Galvanized surface

Sendzimir process (named after Tadeusz Sendzimir) is used to galvanize a steel strip by using a small amount of aluminum in the zinc bath and producing a coating with essentially no iron-zinc alloy. The process guarantees high resistance and durability characteristics. About 75% of hydrogen was needed in the original Sendzimir process but all the newer nonoxidizing methods of degreasing require only 7–15%.

The rolling of hot steel slabs using a Sendzimir mill requires a much smaller operational area than a continuous hot strip mill. This milling process is not recommended for heavy duty running surfaces such as crane rail.

== See also ==
- Hot-dip galvanizing
- Jewelling
- Phosphate conversion coating
- Quench polish quench
