= Galvannealed =

Result from the processes of galvanizing followed by annealing of sheet steel

Galvannealed or galvanneal (galvannealed steel) is the result from the processes of galvanizing followed by annealing of sheet steel.

Galvannealed steel is a matte uniform grey color, which can be easily painted. In comparison to galvanized steel the coating is harder, and more brittle.

== Production and properties ==
Production of galvannealed sheet steel begins with hot dip galvanization of sheet steel. After passing through the galvanizing zinc bath the sheet steel passes through air knives to remove excess zinc, and is then heated in an annealing furnace for several seconds causing iron and zinc layers to diffuse into one another causing the formation of zinc-iron alloy layers at the surface. The annealing step is performed with the strip still hot after the galvanizing step, with the zinc still liquid. The galvanising bath contains slightly over 0.1% aluminium, added to form a layer bonding between the iron and coated zinc. Annealing temperatures are around 500 to 565 °C. Pre-1990 annealing lines used gas-fired heating; post-1990s the use of induction furnaces became common.

Three distinct alloys are identified in the galvannealed surface. From the steel boundary these are named the Gamma (Γ), Zeta (ζ), and Delta (δ) layers, of compositions Fe_{3}Zn_{10}, FeZn_{10}, FeZn_{13} respectively; resulting in an overall bulk iron content of 9-12%. The layers also contain around 1-4% aluminium. Composition depends primarily on heating time and temperature, limited by the diffusion of the two metals.

The resulting coating has a matte appearance, and is hard and brittle - under further working such as pressing or bending powder is produced from degradation of the coating, together with cracks on the surface. In comparison to a zinc (galvanized) coating galvannealed has better spot weldability, and is paintable, Due to iron present in the surface alloy phase galvanneal develops a reddish patina in moist environments - it is generally used painted. Zinc phosphate coating is a common pre-painting surface treatment.

Galvannealed sheet can also be produced from electroplated zinc steel sheet.

== History ==
Patents relating to Galvannealed wire were obtained by the Keystone Steel and Wire Company (Peoria, Illinois, USA) c. 1923. The company used the name "Galvannealed" as a brand name. The key early patent was US patent No. 1430648 (J.L. Herman, 1922, Peoria, Illinois, USA) "Process of coating and treating materials having an iron base". The patent described the galvannealing process with specific reference to iron wires.

== Uses ==
A major market for galvannealed steel is the automobile industry. In the mid 1980s, the Chrysler Corporation pioneered the use of Galvannealed sheet steels in the manufacture of their vehicles. In the 1990s galvannealled coatings were used by Honda, Toyota and Ford, with hot dip galvanized, electrogalvanized and other coatings (e.g. Zn-Ni) being used by other manufacturers, with variations depending on the part within the car frame, as well as due to local price differences.

Galvannealed steel is the preferred material for use in the construction of permanent debris and linen chute systems.
