= Paul Jacques Malouin =

French physician and chemist

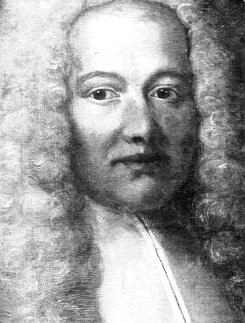
- Born: 27 June 1701; Caen, France
- Died: 3 January 1778 (aged 76); Versailles, France
- Known for: Epidemiology
- Scientific career
- Fields: Physician and Chemist
- Workplaces: University of Paris

Paul Jacques Malouin (27 June 1701 – 3 January 1778) was a French physician and chemist.

== Career ==
Born in Caen, Malouin graduated in medicine in 1730 against the wishes of his father (a legal official from Caen) who had sent him to Paris to study law. He settled in Paris in 1734 and opened a medical practice which attracted patients from the aristocracy and royal family.

With the help of Fontenelle, a distant relation, he entered the French Academy of Sciences in 1742 where his particular research interest was the application of chemistry to medicine. In 1745 he was appointed professor of chemistry at the Jardin du Roi.

For nine consecutive years he studied the epidemics raging in Paris and recorded the results of his research in his Mémoires published by the Academy of Sciences between 1746 and 1754, linking epidemic diseases to air temperature.

In 1753 Malouin began a formal association with the royal court when he bought from Lassone the position of médecin de la reine (physician to the queen) for the sum of 22,000 livres; he was subsequently made physician to the Dauphine in 1770. Thereafter he spent increasing amounts of time at court, being granted an apartment in the Louvre and having rooms at Versailles.

In 1742 Malouin described, in a presentation to the Royal Academy, a method of coating iron by dipping it in molten zinc (i.e. hot-dip galvanizing).

In 1753 he became a Fellow of the Royal Society and in 1767 was made a professor at the Collège de France. In 1776 he was appointed professor at the Royal College where he occupied the Chair of Medicine until his death in January 1778 in Versailles. It was recorded that at the time of his death his fortune amounted to 132,775 livres, 110,000 of which was in the form of state bonds. Another 18,500 was invested in the Compagnie des Indes; his personal possessions were valued at 3,275 livres.

== Publications ==
- Traité de chimie, contenant la manière de préparer les remèdes qui sont le plus en usage dans la pratique de la médecine, Paris, 1734, in-12° (Treatise of Chemistry, containing many instructions on the preparation of remedies used in medical practice at the time.
- Lettre en réponse à la critique du Traité de chimie, Paris, 1735, in-12.
- Pharmacopée chimique, ou chimie médicinale, Paris, 1760, 2 vol. in-12; 1755, in-12.
- Arts du meunier, du boulanger et du vermicellier, dans la collection des Arts et métiers publiée par l’Académie des sciences.

Articles in the Memoirs of the Académie des sciences:

- Histoire des maladies épidémiques observées à Paris en même temps que les différentes températures de l’air, depuis 1746 jusqu’en 1754.
- Analyse des eaux savonneuses de Plombières, 1746.

He also contributed more than 75 articles to Charles-Joseph Panckoucke's Encyclopédie Méthodique, 71 to the Encyclopédie of Diderot, and wrote articles for the Académie des Sciences' Descriptions des Arts et Métiers.
