= Eco pickled surface =

Eco pickled surface (EPS) is a process applied to hot rolled sheet steel to remove all surface oxides (mill scale) and clean the steel surface. Steel which has undergone the EPS process acquires a high degree of resistance to subsequent development of surface oxide (rust), so long as it does not come into direct contact with moisture. EPS was developed by The Material Works, Ltd., which has filed several patent applications covering the process. It is primarily intended to be a replacement of the acid pickling process wherein steel strip is immersed in solutions of hydrochloric and sulfuric acids to chemically remove oxides.

== Overview of the EPS process ==
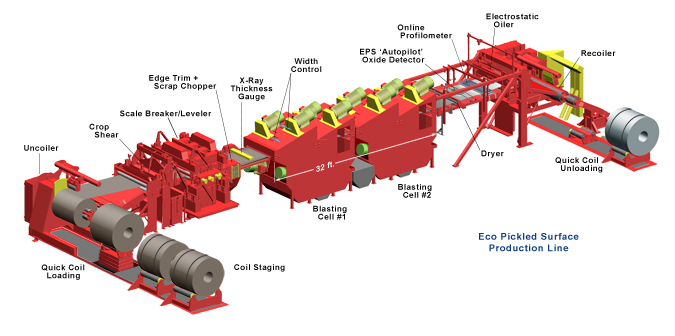
Figure 2: EPS processing line

The EPS process (see Figure 2) begins with hot rolled strip steel in coil form. This steel pays off of an uncoiler, then passes through a machine which serves the purpose of "scale breaker", "leveler" or both. This machine (see Figure 2) works the material between sets of hardened rollers. This has the effect of removing the curvature of the strip ("coil set") and breaking loose the outer layers of mill scale which encase the steel strip.

After passing through the "scale breaker/leveler" machine, the steel strip enters the first "EPS slurry blasting cell". Slurry blasting is a wet abrasive blasting process that combines a fine-particle metallic abrasive with a "carrier liquid" (the most common one being water). This abrasive + water slurry mixture is fed into a rotating impeller which propels it at high velocity across the object to be cleaned (see Figure 3). Slurry blasting is a method for removing rust/scale, for blast cleaning and shot peening. Cleaning agents can be introduced into the carrier liquid to reduce smut and aid in rust prevention.

An EPS slurry blasting cell is composed of eight of the slurry discharge heads shown in Figure 3 – four for the top surface and four for the bottom surface of the strip. Inside the slurry blasting cell, jets of water cleanse the steel strip of both the abrasive particles and the dislodged mill scale. An EPS production system may use multiple EPS slurry blasting cells arranged in tandem, so the steel strip passes from one cell into the next, then into the next, and so on. Multiple cells increase the exposure of the steel strip to the slurry blast streams, thereby allowing the strip to move faster, yet still achieve the necessary level of scale removal. The strip speed and, therefore, system output increases in rough proportion to the number of EPS slurry blasting cells used.

The strip emerges from the final blasting cell and is dried using high-velocity air blowers. At this point the strip passes beneath a real-time oxide detector camera, which provides feedback to the line control to assure full oxide removal is accomplished.

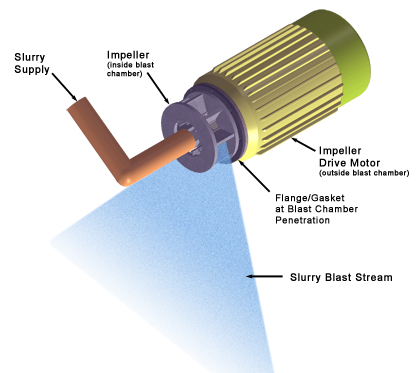
Figure 3: EPS slurry blasting discharge head

To conclude the process, the strip may, optionally, have an oil film or lubricant applied, then it is recoiled. Of note is that tension created by the force of the recoiler pulling the strip through the scale breaker/leveler serves to flatten the strip, removing bow, edge wave and minor coil breaks. Also, not shown in Figure 2 is the slurry delivery/recirculation/filtering system. This closed-loop system collects the carrier liquid, abrasive and removed scale, filters out the removed scale, other contaminants and "undersized" abrasive particles, and returns a cleansed slurry mixture back to the blasting cells.

== Characteristics of EPS-processed steel strip ==
Steel which utilizes the EPS process to remove surface scale shows few differences from steel which utilizes acid pickling to remove surface scale. "Downstream" industrial processes such as galvanizing, cold reducing and painting of EPS-processed steel strip show it to be interchangeable with acid-pickled steel strip. This also holds true for common sheet metal fabrication processes, such as laser cutting, plasma cutting, stamping, welding, bending, and roll forming – no meaningful difference between steel strip using the EPS process and steel strip using acid pickling.

An area where the difference between EPS-processed steel strip and acid-pickled steel strip is apparent is visual appearance. Steel which has undergone EPS processing exhibits a more uniform, lustrous appearance, as shown in Figure 4. In the EPS process, the impact of the abrasive particles on the steel surface serves to "smooth out" minor surface imperfections such as scratches, pits, roll marks and silicone streaks.

Another area of difference between EPS-treated steel strip and acid-pickled steel strip is rust resistance. Conventional acid-pickled steel strip is frequently coated with a thin film of oil to serve as a barrier to contact with oxygen so as to prevent rusting. EPS-processed steel is inherently rust-inhibitive and, therefore, needs no oil or other coating to prevent rusting. Many "downstream" processes and steel fabrication processes must have the steel's oil coating (or other surface contaminants) removed as a precursor step of the process. Use of EPS-treated steel in these processes precludes the need for any such "oil-stripping" precursor step, thereby simplifying the process.

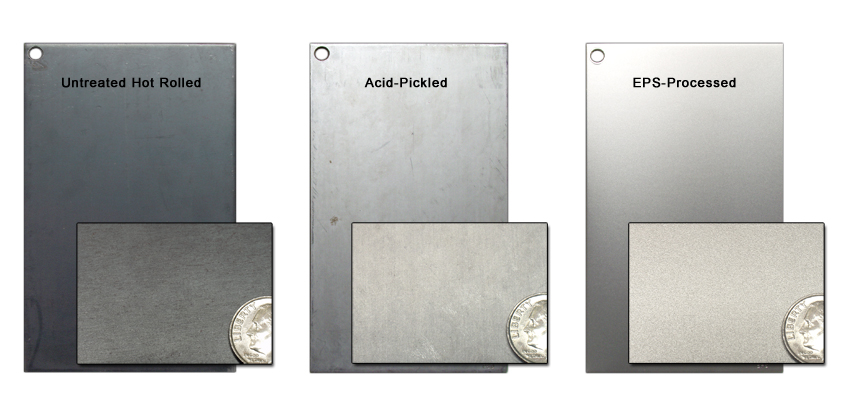
Figure 4: Samples of steel strip from the same coil (l to r): untreated, acid-pickled, EPS-processed

== The rust inhibitive property of EPS-processed strip ==
The rust resistance of EPS-processed steel strip is superior to that of acid pickled steel strip primarily because acid pickling imposes a corrosion "penalty" on the steel which EPS processing does not. This penalty is a result of chemical reactions that occur after acid pickling and serve as a catalyst for oxidation. The primary pickling agent is hydrochloric acid (HCl). Although the steel strip is thoroughly rinsed with clean water after immersion in the HCl bath, some residual amount of chlorine (Cl) remains on the surface of the strip. Chlorine reacts very readily with oxygen to form chlorides, so the free Cl acts as something of a "magnet" for oxygen. This mechanism makes acid-pickled steel more prone to picking up oxygen, whereas there is no comparable mechanism at work with EPS mechanical pickling.

In addition to the free Cl, compounds known as "chloride salts" remain on the surface of acid pickled steel in trace amounts, even after rinsing. Chloride salts react rapidly with moisture and accelerate oxidation of iron on the steel's surface. To prevent oxidation of the iron in the acid pickled strip, a thin film of oil is applied to the surface to serve as a barrier between the free Cl, chloride salts and oxygen. No such protective barrier is needed for EPS-processed steel, as no free Cl or chloride salts are present.

However, an additive is used in the EPS slurry blast carrier liquid to reduce the "smut" that would otherwise remain on the surface and dull the appearance of EPS-processed strip. This additive contains a rust inhibitor, a residual amount of which remains on the surface even after rinsing. It is believed that the presence of the rust inhibitor adds to the overall EPS-processed strip's ability to resist rusting. The additive has been demonstrated to have no impact on paint performance.

== The EPS process as a replacement for acid pickling ==
The EPS process produces scale-free steel strip which is interchangeable with acid-pickled steel strip, yet the EPS process entails lower capital and operating (variable) cost than an acid-pickling line of equivalent output. For this reason the EPS process is considered to be a direct replacement of acid pickling.

In addition, the EPS process is considered less damaging to the environment than acid pickling for these reasons:

- Lower energy consumption;
- No hazardous/acidic substances used in the process;
- No potential exposure to acid fumes for people, equipment or buildings;
- No hazardous or polluting outputs or byproducts of the process with disposal or fume stack liabilities.

== Applications ==
Eco pickled surface technology has been tested and approved for use as a replacement for acid pickled steel by automotive manufacturers General Motors and Chrysler. The Eco Pickled Surface process was a finalist in the 2013 American Metal Market (AMM) Awards for Steel Excellence.
