= Z-Mill =

Type of rolling mill

Schematic of a Sendzimir Mill

The Z-Mill or Sendzimir Mill is a machine for rolling steels. Unlike a traditional rolling mill this 20-high cluster mill configuration utilizes cascaded supporting rolls to apply force on the small work rolls in the center. This allows the application of a higher roll pressure without bending the work rolls, which would result in poor metal quality. Thus very hard and elastic materials can be rolled.

An early version of a Sendzimir Mill, one with fewer back-up rollers, was installed in the Old Park Silver Mills in Sheffield, England. Its primary function was to roll sheet nickel silver for the city's renowned cutlery and flatware trades. The installation was frequently cited in the Metallurgy degree course at Sheffield University. The Old Park Mills held a key place in the Industrial Revolution. They were originally laid down by Joseph Hancock in 1762–65 to produce Old Sheffield Plate - a thinner layer of silver fused onto thicker copper was then rolled into sheets - for the emerging Sheffield silverware industry. As such, the factory was probably one of the first in the world solely producing a semi-manufacture for other businesses. The original Old Sheffield Plate, now much sought after by collectors, lasted for almost a century until it was superseded by electroplate technology in the mid-nineteenth century. Then the Old Park business switched to rolling nickel silver which, after manufacture, was electroplated.

Details of the Old Park Silver Mills and the silverware industry are explained in Mary Walton's book "Sheffield : its Story and its Achievements", pp116–120. Although the book was published in 1948 by the "Sheffield Telegraph" it remains in indispensable source on the city's history.

== Development ==
The evolution to the current 20-High Cluster Sendzimir Mill from the early 12-High configuration was pioneered by Tadeusz Sendzimir in the early 1930s. The designs for the Sendzimir Mill were patented.
