= Galvanization =

Process of layering steel or iron with zinc to prevent rusting

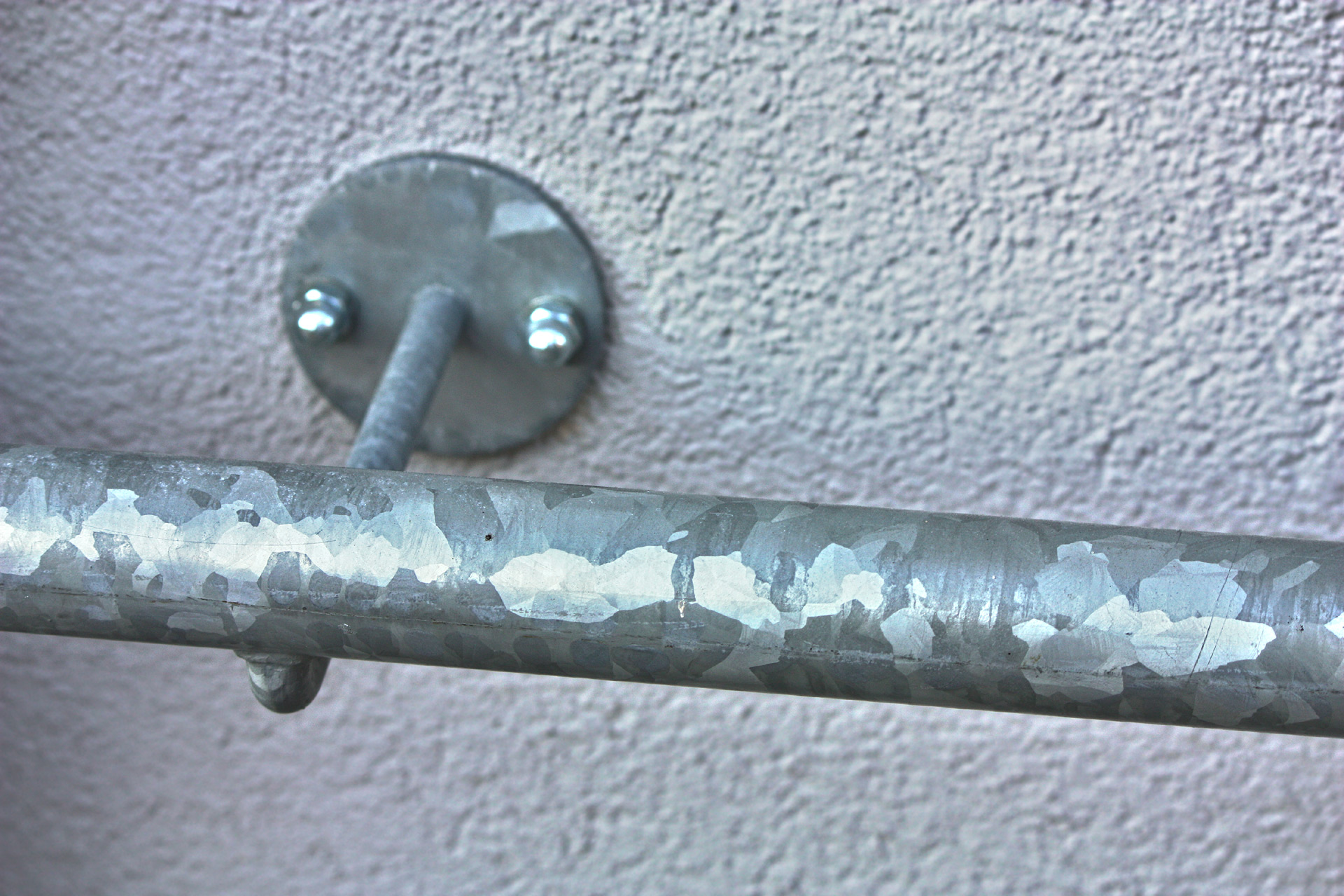
Galvanized surface with visible spangle

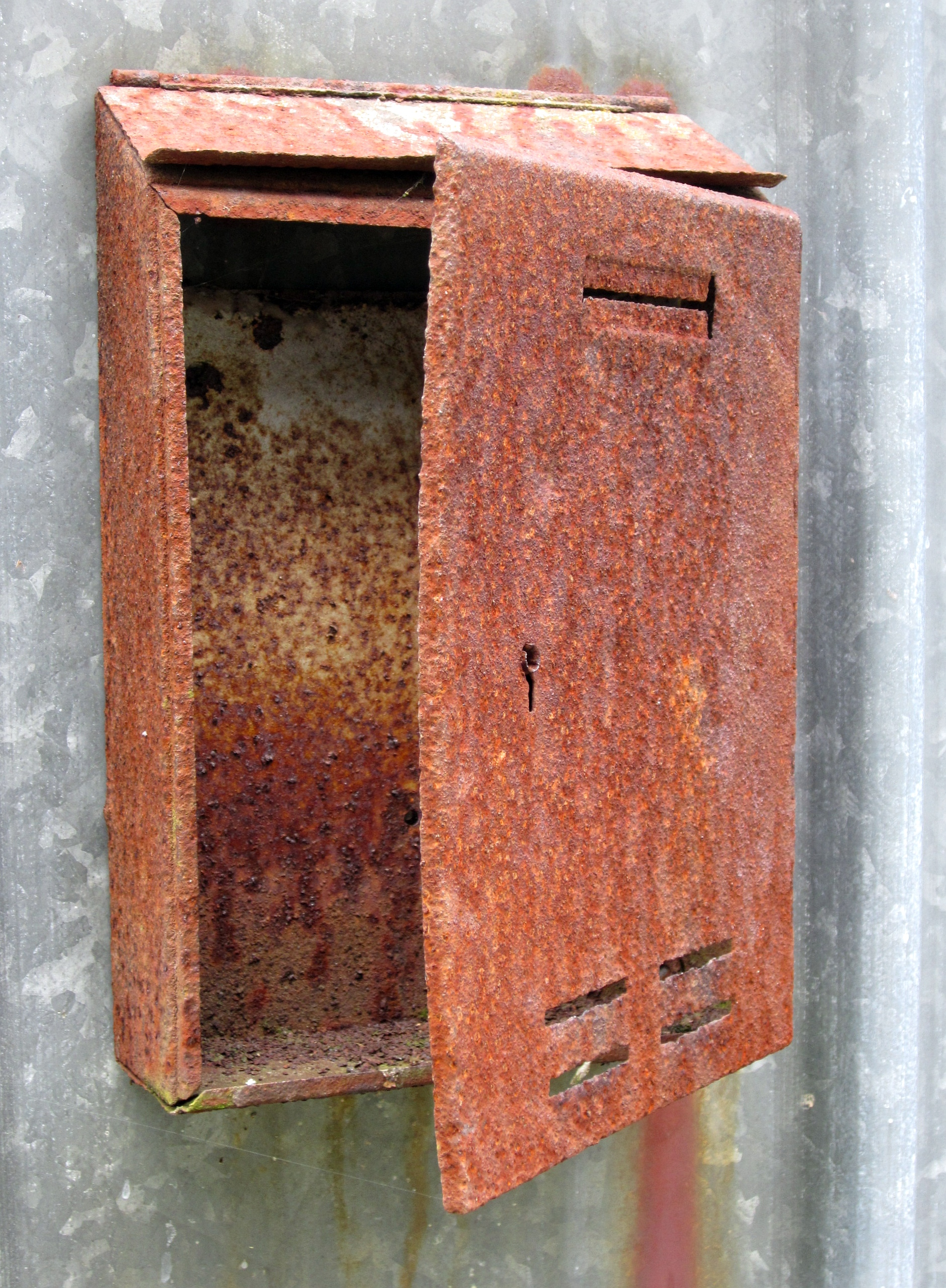
Protective effect: completely rusted letter box mounted to a hot-dip galvanized wall

Galvanization (also spelled galvanisation) is the process of applying a protective zinc coating to steel or iron, to prevent rusting. The most common method is hot-dip galvanizing, in which the parts are coated by submerging them in a bath of hot, molten zinc.

Galvanized steel is widely used in applications where corrosion resistance is needed without the cost of stainless steel, and is considered superior in terms of cost and life-cycle. It can be identified by the crystallization patterning on the surface (often called a "spangle").

Galvanized steel can be welded; however, welding gives off toxic zinc fumes. Welding galvanized steel can be done safely by removing the zinc coating by 1"- 4" around the area to be welded. Grinding is usually the most effective method for the removal of a galvanized coating. This temperature varies by the galvanization process used. In long-term, continuous exposure, the recommended maximum temperature for hot-dip galvanized steel is 200 °C (392 °F), according to the American Galvanizers Association. The use of galvanized steel at temperatures above this will result in peeling of the zinc at the inter-metallic layer.

Like other corrosion protection systems, galvanizing protects steel by acting as a barrier between steel and the atmosphere. However, zinc is a more electropositive (active) metal in comparison to steel. This is a unique characteristic for galvanizing, which means that when a galvanized coating is damaged and steel is exposed to the atmosphere, zinc can continue to protect steel through galvanic corrosion (often within an annulus of 5 mm, above which electron transfer rate decreases).

== History and etymology ==
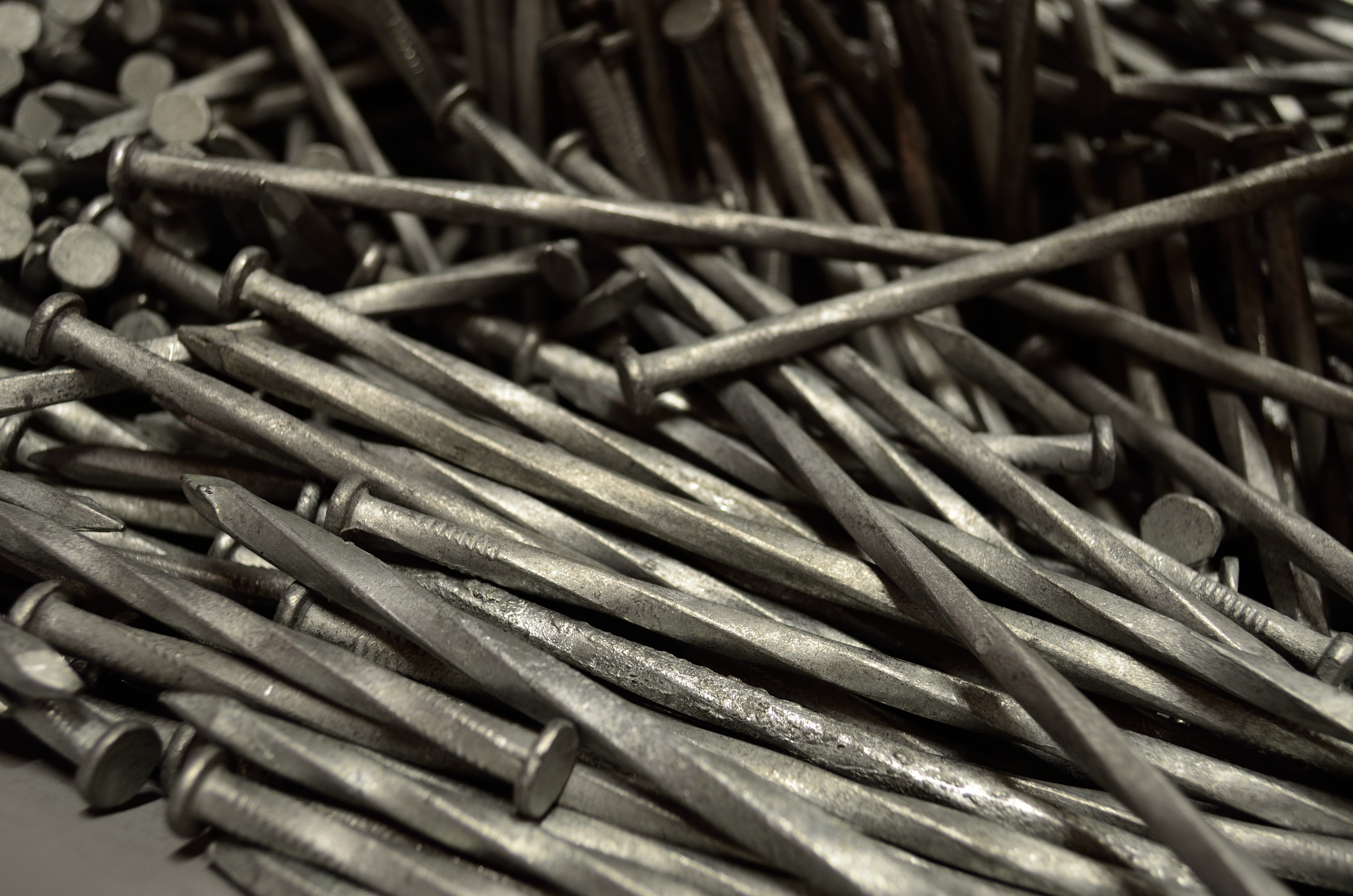
Galvanized nails

The process is named after the Italian physician, physicist, biologist and philosopher Luigi Galvani (9 September 1737 – 4 December 1798). The earliest known example of galvanized iron was discovered on an Indian armour in the Royal Armouries Museum collection in the United Kingdom, known from inscriptions to be earlier than the 1680s

The term "galvanized" can also be used metaphorically of any stimulus which results in activity by a person or group of people.

In modern usage, the term "galvanizing" has largely come to be associated with zinc coatings, to the exclusion of other metals. Galvanic paint, a precursor to hot-dip galvanizing, was patented by Stanislas Sorel, of Paris, on June 10, 1837, as an adoption of a term from a highly fashionable field of contemporary science, despite having no evident relation to it.

== Principle ==
The zinc coating, when intact, prevents corrosive substances from reaching the underlying iron. Its main function is to act as a sacrificial anode to prevent the iron from rusting by cathodic protection. Zinc is more reactive than iron, so the zinc coating preferentially oxidizes to zinc carbonate, preventing the iron from corroding, even if there are gaps in the zinc coating. Additional electroplating such as a chromate conversion coating may be applied to provide further surface passivation to the substrate material.

== Corrosion ==
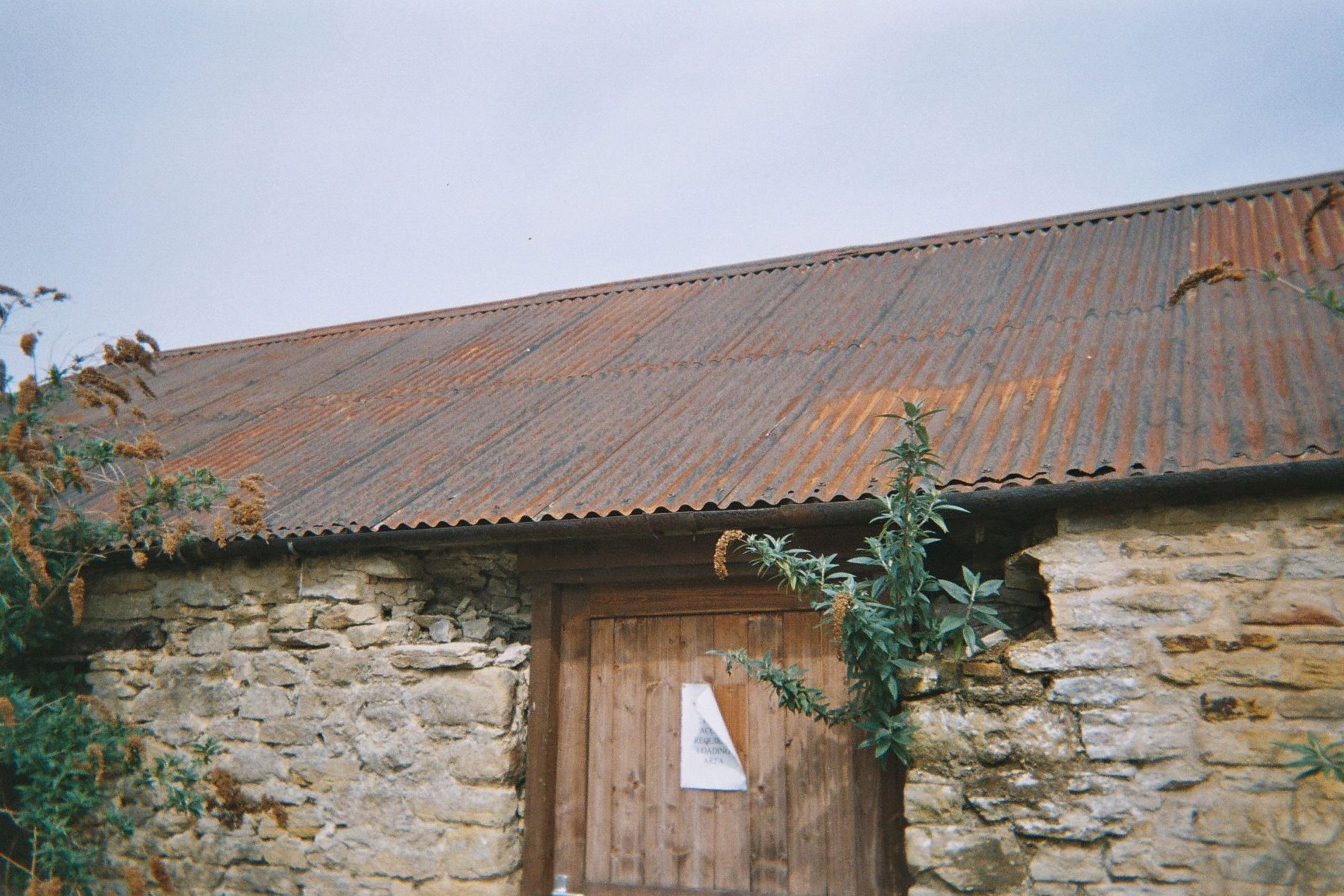
Rusted corrugated steel roof

Galvanized steel can last for many decades if other supplementary measures are maintained, such as paint coatings and additional sacrificial anodes. Corrosion in non-salty environments is caused mainly by levels of sulfur dioxide in the air.

== Methods ==
Hot-dip galvanizing deposits a thick, robust layer of zinc iron alloys on the surface of a steel item. The hot-dip process generally does not reduce strength to a measurable degree, with the exception of high-strength steels where hydrogen embrittlement can become a problem.

Continuous galvanizing is the process of running sheet, wire, and other pre-fabricated continuous steel products through a zinc bath quickly, then removing excess zinc with air knives. Common continuous galvanized grades and products include G60, G90, Galvanealed, and Galvalume.

Galvanization can be done using electricity in electrogalvanization.

Sherardizing provides a zinc diffusion coating on iron- or copper-based materials.

== Common use ==
=== Construction steel ===
This is the most common use for galvanized metal; hundreds of thousands of tons of steel products are galvanized annually worldwide. In developed countries, most larger cities have several galvanizing factories, and many items of steel manufacture are galvanized for protection. Typically these include street furniture, building frameworks, balconies, verandahs, staircases, ladders, walkways, and more. Hot dip galvanized steel is also used for making steel frames as a basic construction material for steel frame buildings.

=== Piping ===
In the early 20th century, galvanized piping swiftly took the place of previously used cast iron and lead in cold-water plumbing. Galvanized piping rusts from the inside out, building up layers of plaque on the inside of the piping, causing both water pressure problems and eventual pipe failure. These plaques can flake off, leading to visible impurities in water and a slight metallic taste. The life expectancy of galvanized piping is about 40–50 years, but it may vary on how well the pipes were built and installed. Pipe longevity also depends on the thickness of zinc in the original galvanizing, which ranges on a scale from G01 to G360.

=== Automotive ===
In the case of automobile bodies, where additional decorative coatings of paint will be applied, a thinner form of galvanizing is applied by electrogalvanizing. Electrogalvanized sheet steel is often used in automotive manufacturing to enhance the corrosion performance of exterior body panels; this tends to achieve lower coating thicknesses of zinc compared to hot-dip galvanization.

== See also ==
- Electroplating
- Aluminized steel
- Cathodic protection
- Corrugated galvanized iron
- Galvanic corrosion
- Galvannealed – galvanization and annealing
- Prepainted metal
- Rust
- Rustproofing
- Sendzimir process
- Sherardizing
- Corrosion
- Sacrificial metal
- Corrosion engineering
