= Electrogalvanization =

Process of electroplating zinc onto steel

Electrogalvanizing is a process in which a layer of zinc is bonded to steel to protect against corrosion, enhance adhesion, or give an aesthetic appeal. The process involves electroplating, running a current of electricity through a saline-/zinc-based electrolytic solution with a zinc anode and steel cathode. Such zinc electroplating or zinc alloy electroplating maintains a dominant position among other electroplating process options, based upon electroplated tonnage per annum. According to the International Zinc Association, more than 5 million tons are used yearly for both hot-dip galvanization and electroplating. The plating of zinc was developed at the beginning of the 20th century. At that time, the electrolytic solution was cyanide-based. A significant innovation occurred in the 1960s with the introduction of the first acid chloride-based electrolyte. The 1980s saw a return to alkaline electrolytes, only this time, without the use of cyanide. The most commonly used electrogalvanized cold-rolled steel is SECC, acronym of "steel, electrogalvanized, cold-rolled, commercial-quality." Compared to hot-dip galvanization, electrogalvanization offers these significant advantages:

- Lower thickness deposits to achieve comparable performance
- Broader conversion coating availability for increased performance and colour options
- Brighter, more aesthetically appealing deposits

== History ==
Zinc plating was developed and continues to evolve to meet the most challenging corrosion protection, temperature, and wear resistance requirements. Electroplating of zinc was invented in 1800, but the first bright deposits were not obtained until the early 1930s with the alkaline cyanide electrolyte. Much later, in 1966, the use of acid chloride baths improved the brightness even further. The latest modern development occurred in the 1980s, with the new generation of alkaline, cyanide-free zinc. Recent European Union directives (ELV/RoHS/WEEE) prohibit automotive, other original equipment manufacturers (OEM) and electrical and electronic equipment manufacturers from using hexavalent chromium (CrVI). These directives, combined with increased performance requirements by the OEM, has led to an increase in the use of alkaline zinc, zinc alloys and high performance trivalent passivating conversion coatings.

During the 1980s with the first alkaline Zn/Fe (99.5%/0.5%) deposits and Zn/Ni (94%/6%) deposits were used. Recently, the reinforcement of the corrosion specifications of major European car makers and the End of Life Vehicles Directive (banishing the use of hexavalent chromium conversion coating) required greater use of alkaline Zn/Ni containing between 12 and 15% Ni (Zn/Ni 86/14). Only Zn/Ni (86%/14%) is an alloy while lower content of iron, cobalt and nickel leads to co-deposits. Zn/Ni (12–15%) in acidic and alkaline electrolytes is plated as the gamma crystalline phase of the Zn-Ni binary phase diagram.

== Processes ==
The corrosion protection afforded by the electrodeposited zinc layer is primarily due to the anodic potential dissolution of zinc versus iron (the substrate in most cases). Zinc acts as a sacrificial anode for protecting the iron (steel). While steel is close to E_{SCE}= -400 mV (the potential refers to the standard Saturated calomel electrode (SCE), depending on the alloy composition, electroplated zinc is much more anodic with E_{SCE}= -980 mV. Steel is preserved from corrosion by cathodic protection. Conversion coatings (hexavalent chromium (CrVI) or trivalent chromium (CrIII) depending upon OEM requirements) are applied to drastically enhance the corrosion protection by building an additional inhibiting layer of Chromium and Zinc hydroxides. These oxide films range in thickness from 10 nm for the thinnest blue/clear passivates to 4 μm for the thickest black chromates.

Additionally, electroplated zinc articles may receive a topcoat to further enhance corrosion protection and friction performance.

The modern electrolytes are both alkaline and acidic:

=== Alkaline electrolytes ===
==== Cyanide electrolytes ====
Zinc is soluble as a cyanide complex Na_{2}Zn(CN)_{4} and as a zincate Na_{2}Zn(OH)_{4}. Quality control of such electrolytes requires the regular analysis of Zn, NaOH and NaCN. The ratio of NaCN : Zn can vary between 2 and 3 depending upon the bath temperature and desired deposit brightness level. The following chart illustrates the typical cyanide electrolyte options used to plate at room temperature:

Cyanide bath composition
	Zinc	Sodium hydroxide	Sodium cyanide
Low cyanide	6-10 g/L (0.8-1.3 oz/gal)	75-90 g/L (10-12 oz/gal)	10-20 g/L 1.3-2.7 oz/gal)
Mid cyanide	15-20 g/L (2.0-2.7 oz/gal)	75-90 g/L (10-12 oz/gal)	25-45 g/L (3.4-6.0 oz/gal)
High cyanide	25-35 g/L (3.4-4.7 oz/gal)	75-90 g/L (10-12 oz/gal)	80-100 g/L (10.70- 13.4 oz/gal)

==== Alkaline non-cyanide electrolytes ====
Contain zinc and sodium hydroxide. Most of them are brightened by proprietary addition agents similar to those used in cyanide baths. The addition of quaternary amine additives contribute to the improved metal distribution between high and low current density areas. Depending upon the desired performance, the electroplater can select the highest zinc content for increased productivity or lower zinc content for a better throwing power (into low current density areas). For ideal metal distribution, Zn metal evolutes between 6-14 g/L (0.8-1.9 oz/gal) and NaOH at 120 g/L (16 oz/gal). But for the highest productivity, Zn metal is between 14-25 g/L (1.9-3.4 oz/gal) and NaOH remains at 120 g/L (16 oz/gal). Alkaline Non Cyanide Zinc Process contains lower concentration zinc metal concentration 6-14 g/L (0.8-1.9 oz/gal) or higher zinc metal concentration 14-25 g/L (1.9-3.4 oz/gal) provides superior plate distribution from high current density to low current density or throwing power when compared to any acidic baths such as chloride based (Low ammonium chloride, Potassium chloride / Ammonium Chloride) - or (non-ammonium chloride, potassium chloride/Boric acid) or sulfate baths.

=== Acidic electrolytes ===
==== High speed electrolytes ====
Dedicated to plating at high speed in plants where the shortest plating time is critical (i.e. steel coil or pipe that runs at up to 200 m/min. The baths contain zinc sulfate and chloride to the maximum solubility level. Boric acid may be used as a pH buffer and to reduce the burning effect at high current densities. These baths contain very few grain refiners. If one is utilized, it may be sodium saccharine.

==== Traditional electrolytes ====
Initially based on ammonium chloride, options today include ammonium, potassium or mixed ammonium/potassium electrolytes. The chosen content of zinc depends on the required productivity and part configuration. High zinc improves the bath's efficiency (plating speed), while lower levels improve the bath's ability to throw into low current densities. Typically, the Zn metal level varies between 20 and 50 g/L (2.7-6.7 oz/gal). The pH varies between 4.8 and 5.8 units. The following chart illustrates a typical all potassium chloride bath composition:

Traditional acid bath composition
Parameters	Value in g/L (oz/gal)
Zinc	40 g/L (5.4 oz/gal)
Total chloride	125 g/L (16.8 oz/gal)
Anhydrous zinc chloride	80 g/L (10.7 oz/gal)
Potassium chloride	180 g/L (24.1 oz/gal)
Boric acid	25 g/L (3.4 oz/gal)

Typical grain refiners include low soluble ketones and aldehydes. These brightening agents must be dissolved in alcohol or in hydrotrope. The resultant molecules are co-deposited with the zinc to produce a slightly leveled, very bright deposit. The bright deposit has also been shown to decrease chromate/passivate receptivity, however. The result is a reduction in the corrosion protection afforded.

=== Alloy processes ===
The corrosion protection is primarily due to the anodic potential dissolution of zinc versus iron. Zinc acts as a sacrificial anode for protecting iron (steel). While steel is close to -400 mV, depending on alloy composition, electroplated zinc is much more anodic with -980 mV. Steel is preserved from corrosion by cathodic protection. Alloying zinc with cobalt or nickel at levels less than 1% has minimal effect on the potential; but both alloys improve the capacity of the zinc layer to develop a chromate film by conversion coating. This further enhances corrosion protection.

On the other hand, Zn/Ni between 12% and 15% Ni (Zn/Ni 86/14) has a potential around -680 mV, which is closer to cadmium -640 mV. During corrosion, the attack of zinc is preferred and the dezincification leads to a consistent increase of the potential towards steel. Thanks to this mechanism of corrosion, this alloy offers much greater protection than other alloys.

For cost reasons, the existing market is divided between alkaline Zn/Fe (99.5%/0.5%) and alkaline Zn/Ni (86%/14%). The use of former alkaline and acidic Zn/Co (99.5%/0.5%) is disappearing from the specifications because Fe gives similar results with less environmental concern. The former Zn/Ni (94%/6%) which was a blend between pure zinc and the crystallographic gamma phase of Zn/Ni (86%/14%), was withdrawn from the European specifications. A specific advantage of alkaline Zn/Ni (86%/14%) involves the lack of hydrogen embrittlement by plating. It was proved that the first nucleation on steel starts with pure nickel, and that this layer is plated 2 nm thick prior to the Zn-Ni. This initial layer prevents hydrogen from penetrating deep into the steel substrate, thus avoiding the serious problems associated with hydrogen embrittlement. The value of this process and the initiation mechanism is quite useful for high strength steel, tool steels and other substrates susceptible to hydrogen embrittlement.

A new acidic Zn/Ni (86%/14%) has been developed which produces a brighter deposit but offers less metal distribution than the alkaline system, and without the aforementioned nickel underlayer, does not offer the same performance in terms of hydrogen embrittlement. Additionally, all the zinc alloys receive the new Cr^{VI} free conversion coating films which are frequently followed by a top-coat to enhance corrosion protection, wear resistance and to control the coefficient of friction.

==== Bath compositions ====
- Composition of electrolyte for plating alkaline zinc-iron at 0,5% in Fe:

Electrolyte
Parameters	Composition in g/L
Zinc	6–20
Iron	0.05–0.4
Caustic soda	120

- Composition of electrolyte for plating acidic zinc-cobalt at 0,5% in Co:

Electrolyte
Parameters	Composition in g/L
Zinc	25–40
Cobalt	2–5
Total chloride	130–180
Potassium chloride	200–250
Boric acid	25

- Composition of electrolyte for plating alkaline zinc-nickel 4-8% in Ni:

Electrolyte
Parameters	Composition in g/L
Zinc	7.5–10
Nickel	1.8–2
Caustic soda	100–120

- Composition of electrolyte for plating alkaline zinc-nickel at 12–15% in Ni:

Electrolyte
Parameters	Composition in g/L
Zinc	7–12
Nickel	1–2.5
Caustic soda	120

- Composition of electrolyte for plating acidic zinc-nickel at 12–15% in Ni:

Electrolyte
Parameters	Composition in g/L
Zinc	30–40
Nickel	25–35
Total chloride	150–230
Boric acid	25
