= Hot-dip galvanization =

Process of coating iron or steel with molten zinc

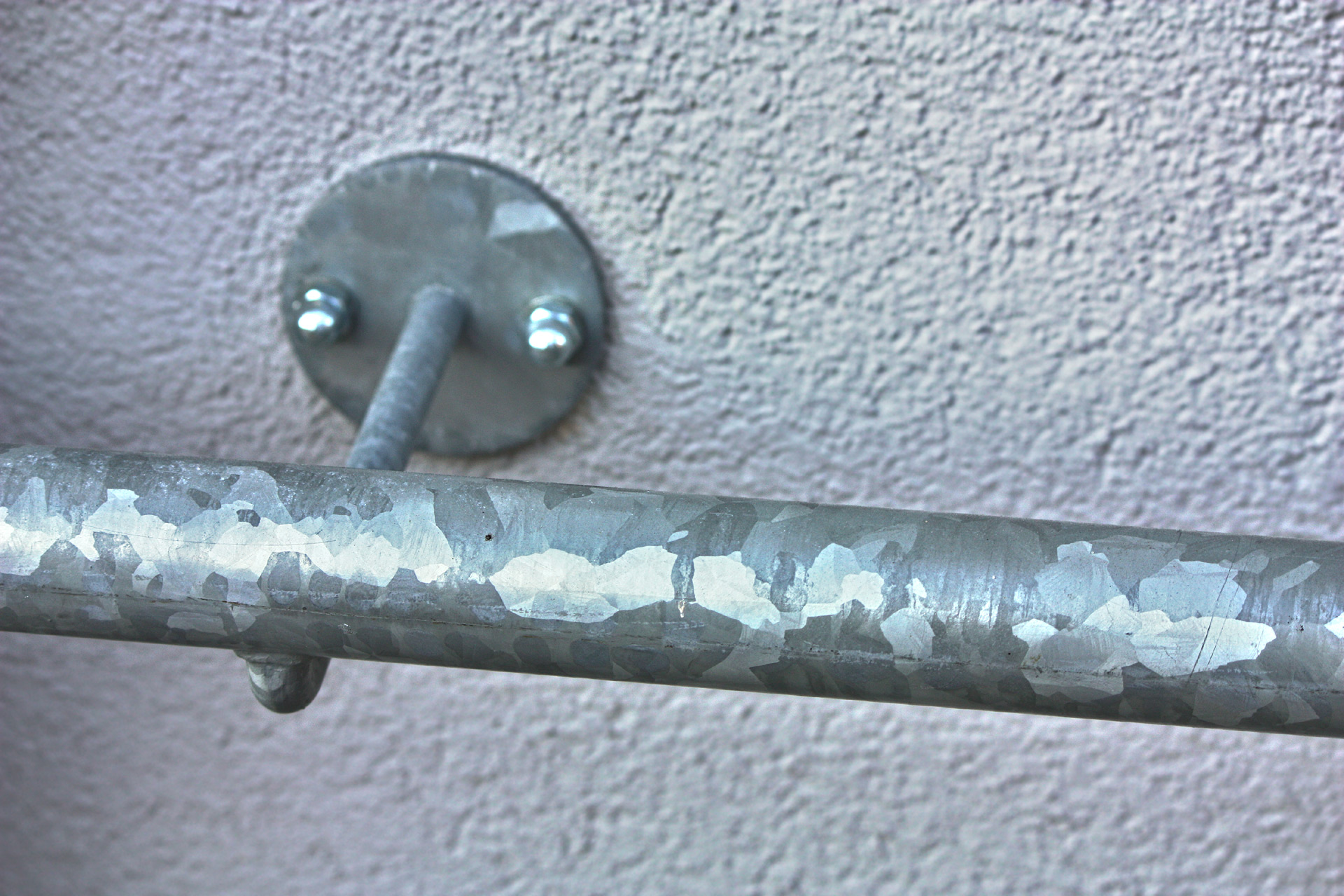
Galvanised hand rail

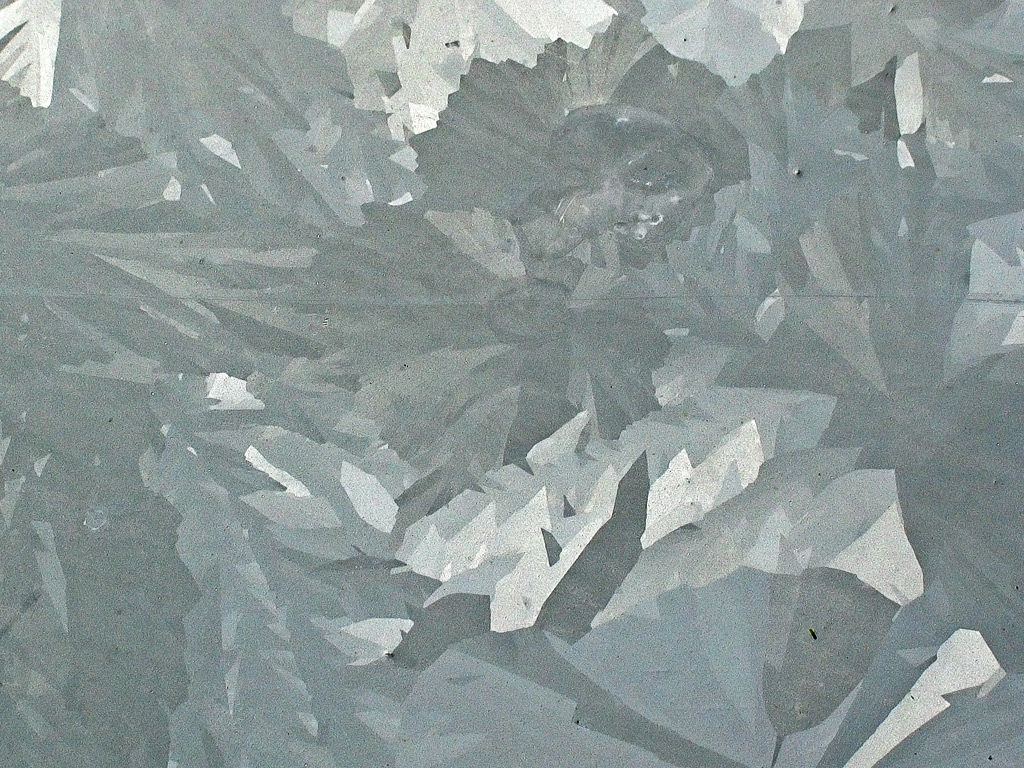
Crystalline surface of a hot-dip galvanized handrail, known as "spangle"

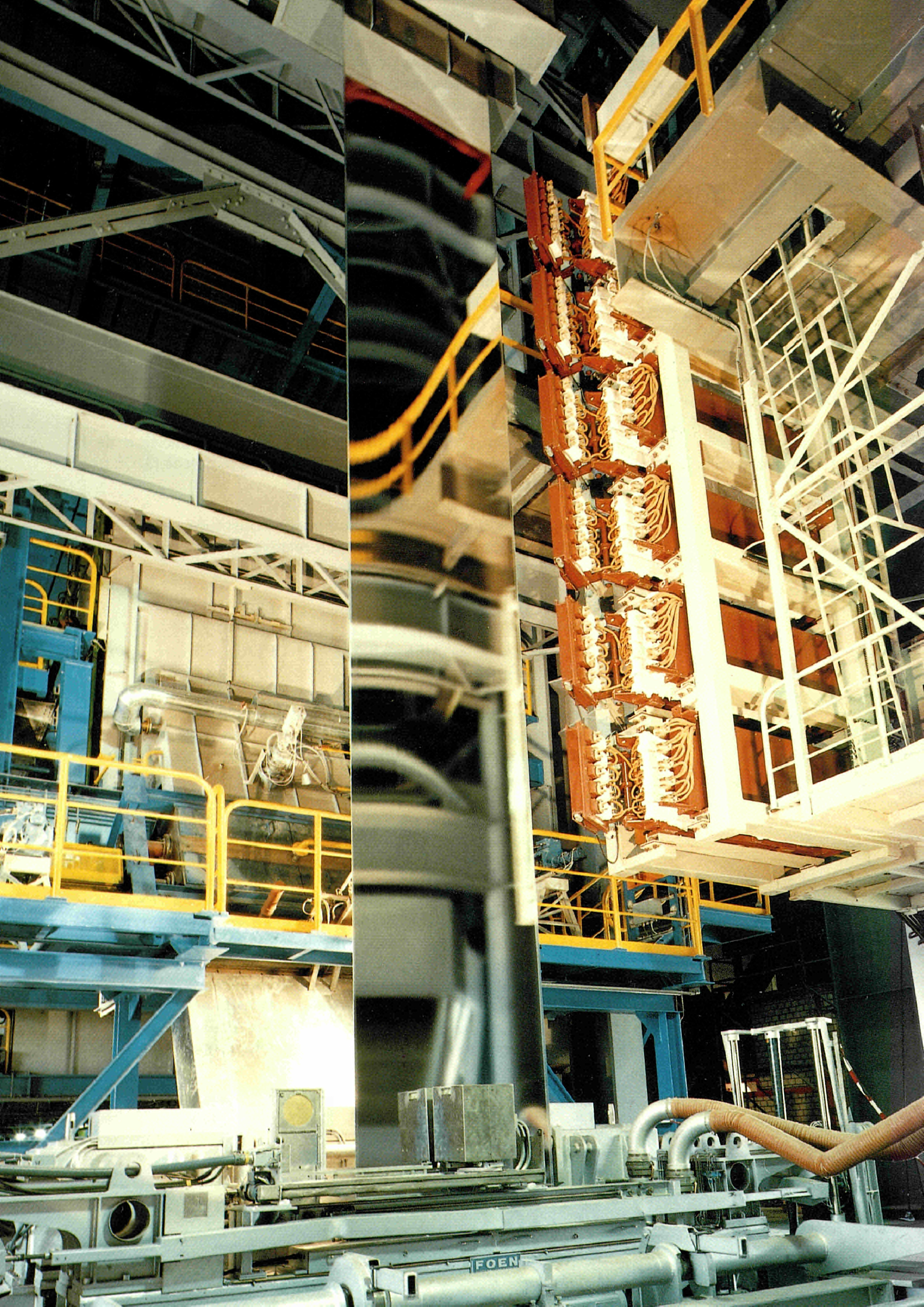
Steel strip coming out of the zinc pot of a continuous vertical hot-dip galvanizing line

Hot-dip galvanization is a form of galvanization (the process of coating iron and steel with zinc) in which the iron or steel is immersed in a bath of molten zinc at a temperature of around 450 °C (842 °F). In such a process, zinc alloys with the surface of the base metal. When exposed to the atmosphere, the pure zinc (Zn) reacts with oxygen (O_{2}) to form zinc oxide (ZnO), which further reacts with carbon dioxide (CO_{2}) to form zinc carbonate (ZnCO_{3}), a usually dull grey, fairly strong material that protects the steel underneath from further corrosion in many circumstances.

Galvanized fumes are released when the galvanized metal reaches a certain temperature. This temperature varies by the galvanization process used. In long-term, continuous exposure, the recommended maximum temperature for hot-dip galvanized steel is 200 °C (392 °F), according to the American Galvanizers Association. The use of galvanized steel at temperatures above this will result in peeling of the zinc at the inter-metallic layer.

== Process ==
The process of hot-dip galvanizing results in a metallurgical bond between zinc and steel, with a series of distinct iron-zinc alloys. The resulting coated steel can be used in much the same way as uncoated.

A typical hot-dip galvanizing line operates as follows:

- Steel is cleaned using a caustic solution. This removes oil, grease, dirt, and paint.
- The caustic cleaning solution is rinsed off.
- The steel is pickled in an acidic solution to remove mill scale.
- The pickling solution is rinsed off.
- A flux, often zinc ammonium chloride is applied to the steel to inhibit oxidation of the cleaned surface upon exposure to air. The flux is allowed to dry on the steel and aids in the process of the liquid zinc wetting and adhering to the steel.
- The steel is dipped into the molten zinc bath and held there until the temperature of the steel equals that of the bath.
- The steel is cooled in a quench tank to reduce its temperature and inhibit undesirable reactions of the newly formed coating with the atmosphere.

Lead is often added to the molten zinc bath to improve the fluidity of the bath (thus limiting excess zinc on the dipped product by improved drainage properties), help prevent floating dross, make dross recycling easier and protect the kettle from uneven heat distribution from the burners. Environmental regulations in the United States disapprove of lead in the kettle bath. Lead is either added to primary Z1 grade zinc or already contained in used secondary zinc. A third, declining method is to use low Z5 grade zinc.

Steel strip can be hot-dip galvanized in a continuous line. Hot-dip galvanized steel strip (also sometimes loosely referred to as galvanized iron) is extensively used for applications requiring the strength of steel combined with the resistance to corrosion of zinc, such as roofing and walling, safety barriers, handrails, consumer appliances and automotive body parts. One common use is in metal pails. Galvanised steel is also used in most heating and cooling duct systems in buildings

Individual metal articles, such as steel girders or wrought iron gates, can be hot-dip galvanized by a process called batch galvanizing. Other modern techniques have largely replaced hot-dip for these sorts of roles. This includes electrogalvanizing, which deposits the layer of zinc from an aqueous electrolyte by electroplating, forming a thinner and much stronger bond.

In some cases, it may be desirable to have designated parts of the metal as non-galvanized. This is often desired when metal will be welded after galvanization. To accomplish this, a galvanizer will typically use a masking compound to coat the areas that will not be galvanized during the hot dip process.

== History ==
In 1742, French chemist Paul Jacques Malouin described a method of coating iron by dipping it in molten zinc in a presentation to the French Royal Academy.

In 1772, Luigi Galvani, for whom galvanizing was named, discovered the electrochemical process that takes place between metals during an experiment with frog legs.

In 1801, Alessandro Volta furthered the research on galvanizing when he discovered the electro-potential between two metals, creating a corrosion cell.

In 1836, French chemist Stanislas Sorel obtained a patent for a method of coating iron with zinc, after first cleaning it with 9% sulfuric acid (H_{2}SO_{4}) and fluxing it with ammonium chloride (NH_{4}Cl).

In 1850, the British galvanizing industry was consuming 10,000 tons of zinc annually for the production of galvanized steel.

== Specification ==
A hot-dip galvanized coating is relatively easier and cheaper to specify than an organic paint coating of equivalent corrosion protection performance. The British, European and International standard for hot-dip galvanizing is BS EN ISO 1461, which specifies a minimum coating thickness to be applied to steel in relation to the steels section thickness e.g. a steel fabrication with a section size thicker than 6 mm shall have a minimum galvanized coating thickness of 85 μm.

Further performance and design information for galvanizing can be found in BS EN ISO 14713-1 and BS EN ISO 14713-2. The durability performance of a galvanized coating depends solely on the corrosion rate of the environment in which it is placed. Corrosion rates for different environments can be found in BS EN ISO 14713-1, where typical corrosion rates are given, along with a description of the environment in which the steel would be used.

== See also ==
- Electrogalvanization
- Plating
- Bolt manufacturing process
- Corrugated galvanised iron
- Galvannealed – galvanization and annealing
- Jewelling
- Liquid metal embrittlement
- Metal fume fever
- Prepainted metal
- Sendzimir process
- Surface finishing
- Thermal spraying
