= Machine press =

Machine tool that changes the shape of a work piece by the application of pressure

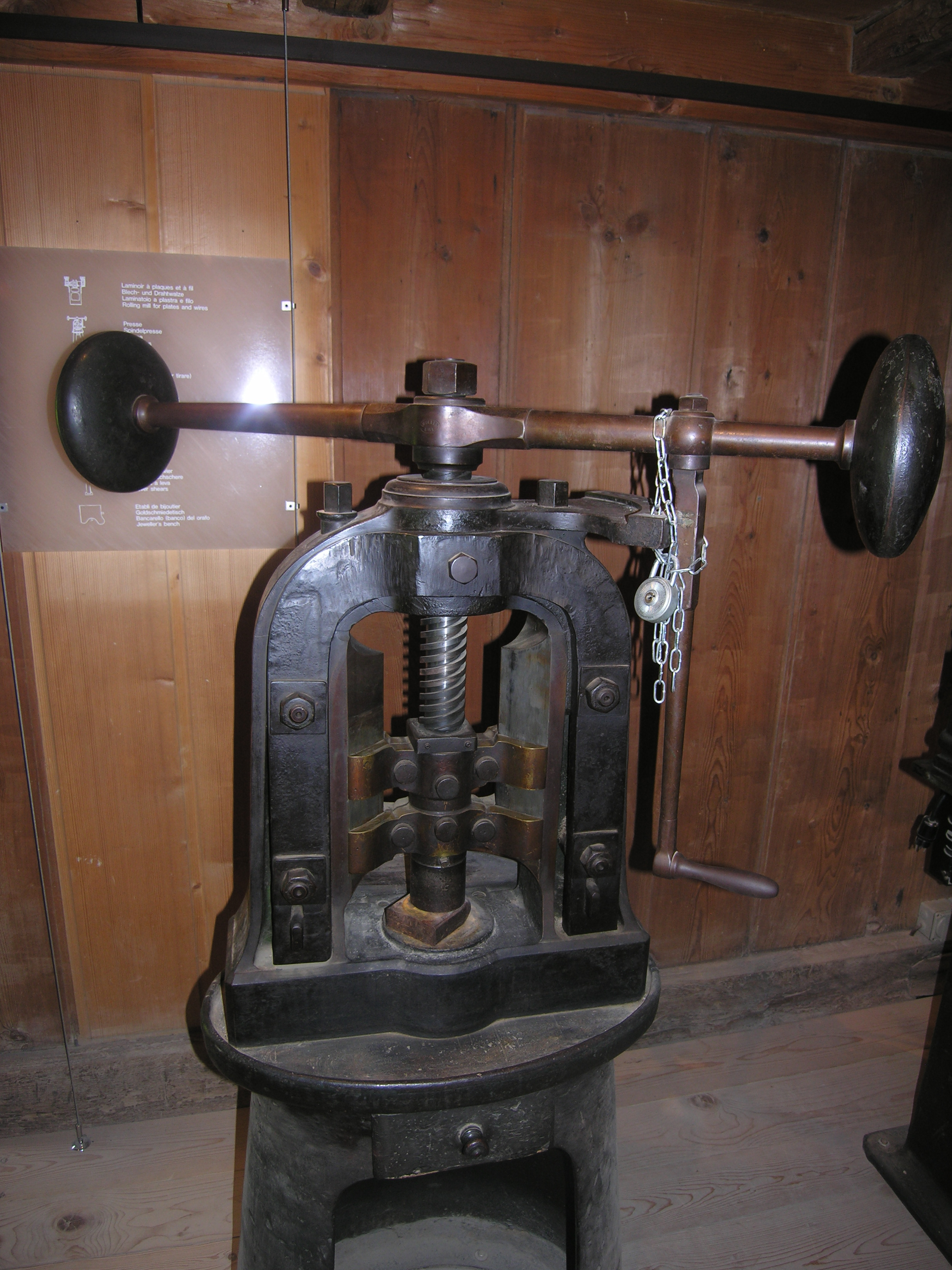
Manual goldsmith press

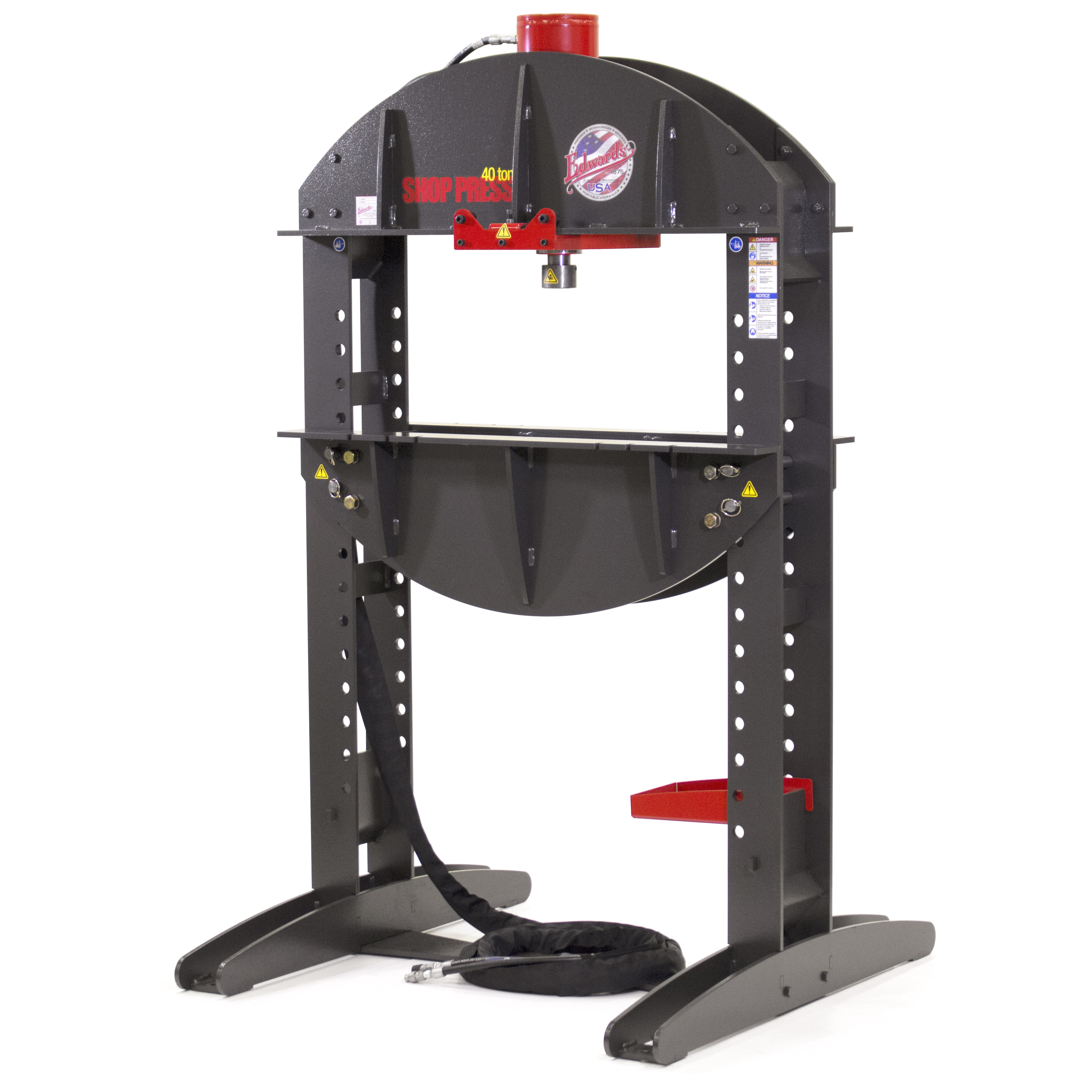
General-purpose hydraulic shop press

Power press with a fixed barrier guard

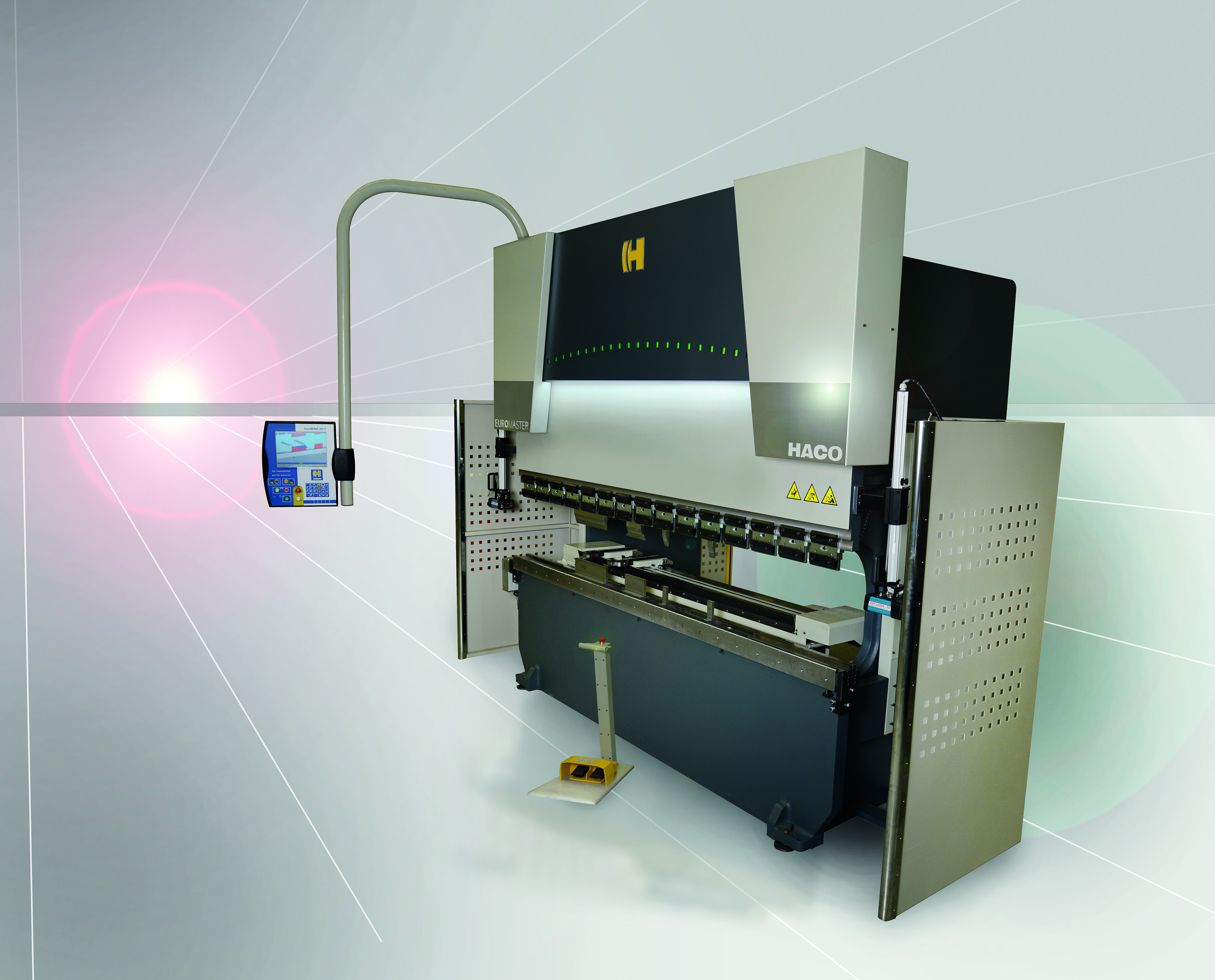
A HACO CNC hydraulic press brake

A press brake bending a sheet of steel

A forming press, commonly shortened to press, is a machine tool that changes the shape of a work-piece by the application of pressure. The operator of a forming press is known as a press-tool setter, often shortened to tool-setter.

Presses can be classified according to

- their mechanism: hydraulic, mechanical, pneumatic;
- their function: forging presses, stamping presses, press brakes, punch press, etc.
- their structure, e.g. Knuckle-joint press, screw press, Expeller press
- their controllability: conventional vs. servo-presses

== Shop Press ==
Typically consisting of a simple rectangular frame, often fabricated from C-channel or tubing, containing a bottle jack or hydraulic cylinder to apply pressure via a ram to a work-piece. Often used for general-purpose forming work in the auto mechanic shop, machine shop, garage or basement shops, etc. Typical shop presses are capable of applying between 1 and 30 tons pressure, depending on size and construction. Lighter-duty versions are often called arbor presses.

A shop press is commonly used to press interference fit parts together, such as gears onto shafts or bearings into housings.

== Other presses by application ==
- A press brake is a special type of machine press that bends sheet metal into shape. A good example of the type of work a press brake can do is the back-plate of a computer case. Other examples include brackets, frame pieces and electronic enclosures. Some press brakes have CNC controls and can form parts with accuracy to a fraction of a millimeter. Bending forces can range up to 3,000 tons.
- A punch press is used to form holes.
- A screw press is also known as a fly press.
- A stamping press is a machine press used to shape or cut metal by deforming it with a die. It generally consists of a press frame, a bolster plate, and a ram.
- Capping presses form caps from rolls of aluminium foil at up to 660 per minute.

== An example of peculiar press control: servo-press ==
A servomechanism press, also known as a servo press or an 'electro-press, is a press driven by an AC servo motor. The torque produced is converted to a linear force via a ball screw. Pressure and position are controlled through a load cell and an encoder. The main advantage of a servo press is its low energy consumption; its only 10-20% of other press machines.

When stamping, it is really about maximizing energy as opposed to how the machine can deliver tonnage. Up until recently, the way to increase tonnage between the die and work-piece on a mechanical press was through bigger machines with bigger motors.

== Types of presses ==
The press style used is in direct correlation to the end product. Press types are straight-side, BG (back geared), geared, gap, OBI (open back inclinable) and OBS (open back stationary). Hydraulic and mechanical presses are classified by the frame the moving elements are mounted on. The most common are the gap-frame, also known as C-frame, and the straight-side press. A straight-side press has vertical columns on either side of the machine and eliminates angular deflection. A C-frame allows easy access to the die area on three sides and require less floor space. A type of gap-frame, the OBI pivots the frame for easier scrap or part discharge. The OBS timed air blasts, devices or conveyor for scrap or part discharge.

Comparison of various machine presses
Type of press	Type of frame							Position of frame				Action			Method of actuation								Type of drive				Suspension			Ram		Bed		
Type of press	Open-back	Gap	Straight-side	Arch	Piller	Solid	Tie rod	Vertical	Horizontal	Inclinable	Inclined	Single	Double	Triple	Crank	Front-to-back crank	Eccentric	Toggle	Screw	Cam	Rack & pinion	Piston	Over direct	Geared, overdrive	Under direct	Geared, underdrive	One-point	Two-point	Four-point	Single	Multiple	Solid	Open	Adjustable
Bench	X	X				X		X		X	X	X			X		X		X			X	X				X			X		X	X	X
Open-back inclinable	X	X				X		X		X		X	X		X		X			X		X	X	X			X	X		X	X		X	
Gap-frame	X	X				X	X	X	X	X	X	X	X		X	X	X	X				X	X	X			X	X	X	X	X	X	X	
Adjustable-bed horn		X				X		X				X			X		X					X	X	X			X	X		X		X	X	X
End-wheel		X				X		X				X				X	X						X	X			X			X		X	X	
Arch-frame			X	X		X		X			X	X			X								X	X			X			X			X	
Straight-side			X	X		X	X	X	X		X	X	X	X	X	X	X				X	X	X	X	X	X	X	X	X	X	X	X	X	
Reducing	X	X	X			X	X	X	X			X			X							X	X	X			X			X			X	
Knuckle-lever			X			X	X	X			X	X	X					X					X	X			X	X		X	X	X	X	
Toggle-draw			X			X	X	X					X	X	X		X	X						X		X	X	X	X		X		X	
Cam-drawing	X	X	X			X	X	X		X			X		X					X			X	X			X				X		X	
Two-point single-action		X	X			X	X	X			X	X			X		X							X		X		X		X		X	X	
High-production			X			X	X	X			X	X			X		X						X	X			X	X		X			X	
Dieing machine					X			X				X			X								X		X		X	X		X			X	
Transfer		X	X			X	X	X				X			X	X	X	X					X	X				X		X			X	
Flat-edge trimming				X		X		X					X							X				X			X			X				
Hydraulic		X	X		X		X	X	X	X		X	X	X								X					X	X		X	X	X	X	X
Press brake	X	X				X		X				X			X							X		X				X	X	X		X		

== History ==
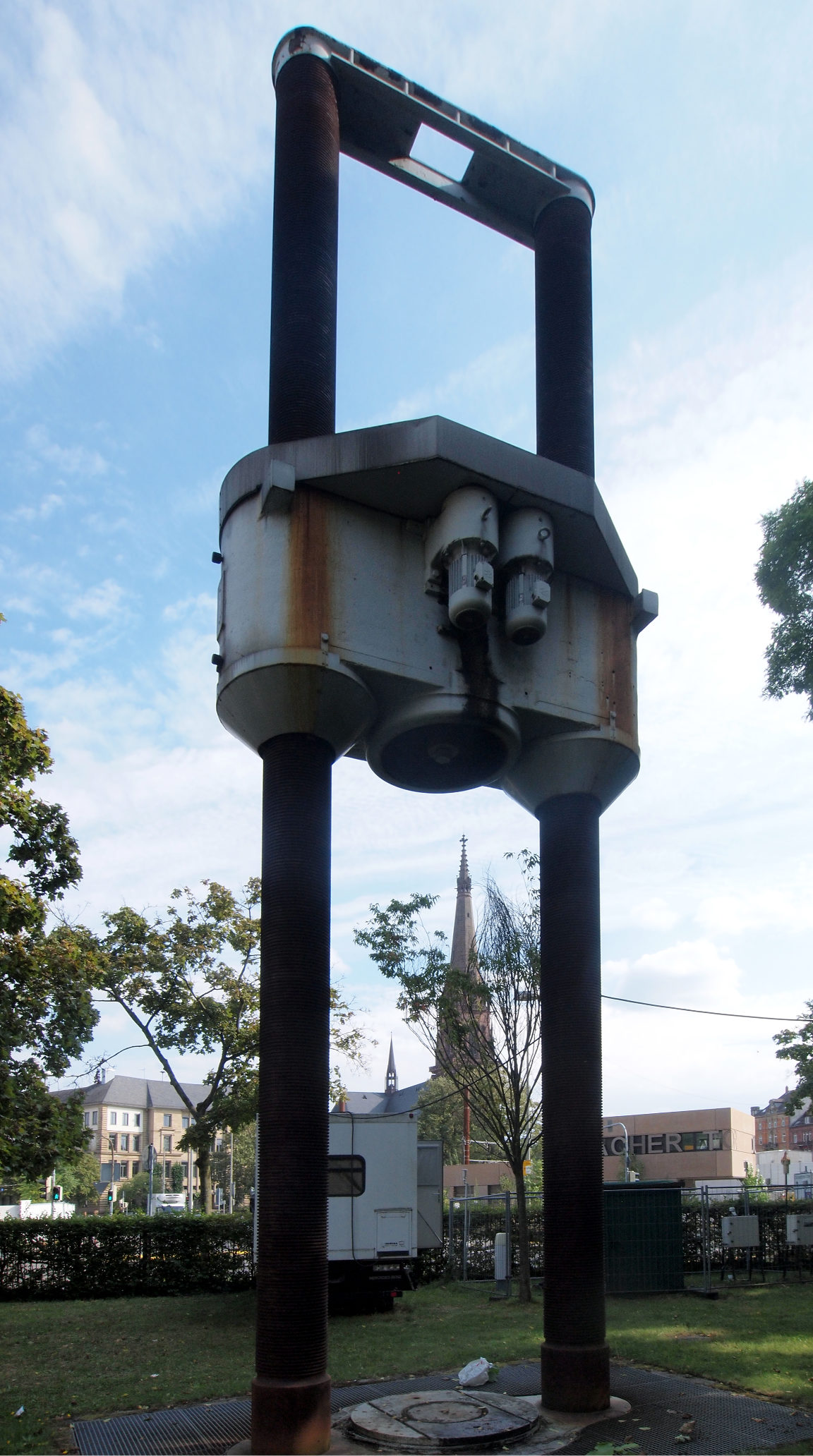
Proofing press from 1941, cultural monument at the Karlsruhe Institute of Technology

Historically, metal was shaped by hand using a hammer. Later, larger hammers were constructed to press more metal at once, or to press thicker materials. Often a smith would employ a helper or apprentice to swing the hammer while the smith concentrated on positioning the work-piece. Drop hammers and trip hammers utilize a mechanism to lift the hammer, which then falls by gravity onto the work.

In the mid 19th century, manual and rotary-cam hammers began to be replaced in industry by the steam hammer, which was first described in 1784 by James Watt, a British inventor and Mechanical Engineer who also contributed to the earliest steam engines and condensers, but not built until 1840 by British inventor James Nasmyth. By the late 19th century, steam hammers had increased greatly in size; in 1891 the Bethlehem Iron Company made an enhancement allowing a steam hammer to deliver a 125-ton blow.

Most modern machine presses typically use a combination of electric motors and hydraulics to achieve the necessary pressure. Along with the evolution of presses came the evolution of the dies used within them.

== Safety ==
Machine presses can be hazardous, so safety measures must always be taken. Bi-manual controls (controls the use of which requires both hands to be on the buttons to operate) are a very good way to prevent accidents, as are light curtains that keep the machine from working if the operator is in range of the die.

== See also ==
- Circle grid analysis
- Forming limit diagram
- Rubber pad forming
- Stamping (metalworking)
- Deep drawing
- Hydroforming
