= Deep drawing =

Metalworking process

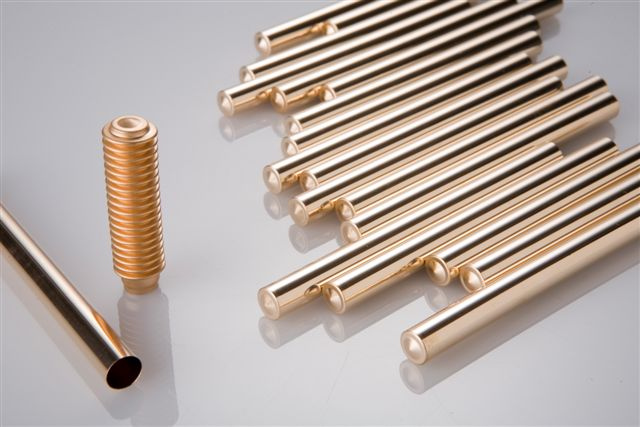
Example of deep drawn parts

Deep drawing is a sheet metal forming process in which a sheet metal blank is radially drawn into a forming die by the mechanical action of a punch. It is thus a shape transformation process with material retention. The process is considered "deep" drawing when the depth of the drawn part exceeds its diameter. This is achieved by redrawing the part through a series of dies.

The flange region (sheet metal in the die shoulder area) experiences a radial drawing stress and a tangential compressive stress due to the material retention property. These compressive stresses (hoop stresses) result in flange wrinkles (wrinkles of the first order). Wrinkles can be prevented by using a blank holder, the function of which is to facilitate controlled material flow into the die radius. Deep drawing presses, especially in the Aerospace and Medical industries, require unparalleled accuracy and precision. Sheet hydroforming presses do complex draw work. Bed size, tonnage, stroke, speed, and more can be tailored to your specific draw forming application.

== Process ==
The total drawing load consists of the ideal forming load and an additional component to compensate for friction in the contacting areas of the flange region and bending forces as well as unbending forces at the die radius. The forming load is transferred from the punch radius through the drawn part wall into the deformation region (sheet metal flange). In the drawn part wall, which is in contact with the punch, the hoop strain is zero whereby the plane strain condition is reached. In reality, mostly the strain condition is only approximately plane. Due to tensile forces acting in the part wall, wall thinning is prominent and results in an uneven part wall thickness, such that the part wall thickness is lowest at the point where the part wall loses contact with the punch, i.e., at the punch radius.

The thinnest part thickness determines the maximum stress that can be transferred to the deformation zone. Due to material volume constancy, the flange thickens and results in blank holder contact at the outer boundary rather than on the entire surface. The maximum stress that can be safely transferred from the punch to the blank sets a limit on the maximum blank size (initial blank diameter in the case of rotationally symmetrical blanks). An indicator of material formability is the limiting drawing ratio (LDR), defined as the ratio of the maximum blank diameter that can be safely drawn into a cup without flange to the punch diameter. Determination of the LDR for complex components is difficult and hence the part is inspected for critical areas for which an approximation is possible. During severe deep drawing the material work hardens and it may be necessary to anneal the parts in controlled atmosphere ovens to restore the original elasticity of the material.

Commercial applications of this metal shaping process often involve complex geometries with straight sides and radii. In such a case, the term stamping is used in order to distinguish between the deep drawing (radial tension-tangential compression) and stretch-and-bend (along the straight sides) components. Deep drawing is always accompanied by other forming techniques within the press. These other forming methods include:

- Beading: Material is displaced to create a larger, or smaller, diameter ring of material beyond the original body diameter of a part, often used to create O-ring seats.
- Bottom Piercing: A round or shaped portion of metal is cut from the drawn part.
- Bulging: In the bulging process a portion of the part's diameter is forced to protrude from the surrounding geometry.
- Coining: Material is displaced to form specific shapes in the part. Typically coining should not exceed a depth of 30% of the material thickness.
- Curling: Metal is rolled under a curling die to create a rolled edge.
- Extruding: After a pilot hole is pierced, a larger diameter punch is pushed through, causing the metal to expand and grow in length.
- Ironing / Wall Thinning: Ironing is a process to reduce the wall thickness of parts. Typically ironing should not exceed a depth of 30% of the material thickness.
- Necking: A portion of the part is reduced in diameter to less than the major diameter.
- Notching: A notch is cut into the open end of the part. This notch can be round, square, or shaped.
- Rib Forming: Rib forming involves creating an inward or outward protruding rib during the drawing process.
- Side Piercing: Holes are pierced in the side wall of the drawn part. The holes may be round or shaped according to specifications.
- Stamping / Marking: This process is typically used to put identification on a part, such as a part number or supplier identification.
- Threading: Using a wheel and arbor, threads are formed into a part. In this way threaded parts can be produced within the stamping press.
- Trimming: In the Trimming process, excess metal that is necessary to draw the part is cut away from the finished part.

Often components are partially deep drawn in order to create a series of diameters throughout the component (as in the image of the deep draw line). It common use to consider this process as a cost saving alternative to turned parts which require much more raw material.

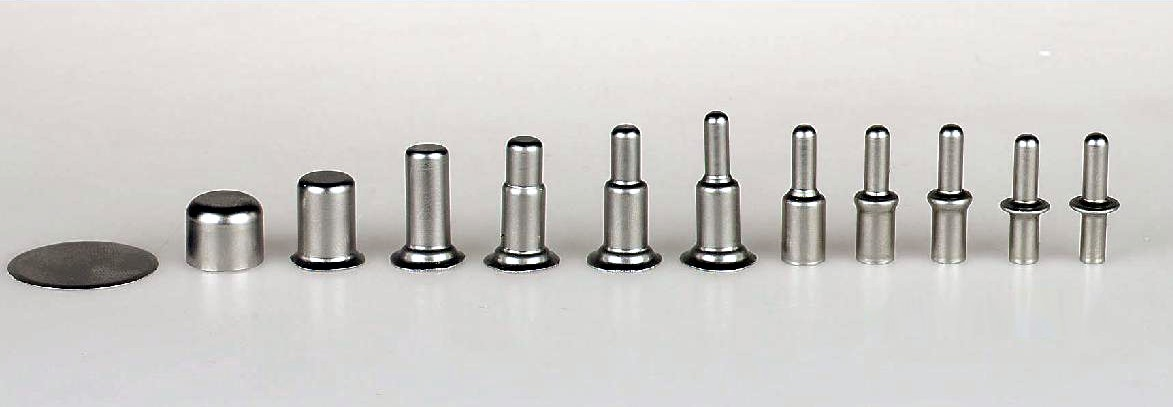
Example of deep drawn line

The sequence of deep drawn components is referred to as a "deep draw line". The numbers of components that form the deep draw line is given by the quantity of "stations" available in the press. In the case of mechanical presses this is determined by the number of cams on the top shaft.

For high precision mass productions, it is always advisable to use a transfer press also known as eyelet press. The advantage of this type of press, in respect to conventional progressive presses, is that the parts are transferred from one die to the next by means of so-called "fingers". Not only do the fingers transfer the parts but they also guide the component during the process. This allows parts to be drawn to the deepest depths with the tightest tolerances.

Other types of presses:

- Die-Set Transfer Press: Part is transferred via transfer fingers as the part progresses through the forming process. Tooling components attached to die plates enable the die to be installed in the press as one unit.
- ICOP (Individually Cam Operated Press): The part is transferred via transfer fingers as the part progresses through the forming process. Die components are installed in the press one station at a time.
- Progressive Die Press: The part is carried on the steel webbing as it progresses through the forming process.

Friction conditions in the blankholder zone are critical for successful deep-drawing operations. Experimental and data-driven studies have shown that lubricant pressure and contact pressure strongly influence the coefficient of friction and the resulting surface quality of deep-drawn steel sheets.

== Variations ==
Deep drawing has been classified into conventional and unconventional deep drawing. The main aim of any unconventional deep drawing process is to extend the formability limits of the process. Some of the unconventional processes include hydromechanical deep drawing, Hydroform process, Aquadraw process, Guerin process, Marform process and the hydraulic deep drawing process to name a few.

The Marform process, for example, operates using the principle of rubber pad forming techniques. Deep-recessed parts with either vertical or sloped walls can be formed. In this type of forming, the die rig employs a rubber pad as one tool half and a solid tool half, similar to the die in a conventional die set, to form a component into its final shape. Dies are made of cast light alloys and the rubber pad is 1.5-2 times thicker than the component to be formed. For Marforming, single-action presses are equipped with die cushions and blank holders. The blank is held against the rubber pad by a blank holder, through which a punch is acting as in conventional deep drawing. It is a double-acting apparatus: at first the ram slides down, then the blank holder moves: this feature allows it to perform deep drawings (30-40% transverse dimension) with no wrinkles.

Industrial uses of deep drawing processes include automotive body and structural parts, aircraft components, utensils and white goods. Complex parts are normally formed using progressive dies in a single forming press or by using a press line.

== Workpiece materials and power requirements ==
Softer materials are much easier to deform and therefore require less force to draw. The following is a table demonstrating the draw force to percent reduction of commonly used materials.

Drawing force required for various materials and reductions [kN]
Material	Percent reduction			
Material	39%	43%	47%	50%
Aluminium	88	101	113	126
Brass	117	134	151	168
Cold-rolled steel	127	145	163	181
Stainless steel	166	190	214	238

== Tool materials ==
Punches and dies are typically made of tool steel, however cheaper (but softer) carbon steel is sometimes used in less severe applications. It is also common to see cemented carbides used where high wear and abrasive resistance is present. Alloy steels are normally used for the ejector system to kick the part out and in durable and heat resistant blank holders.

== Lubrication and cooling ==
Lubricants are used to reduce friction between the working material and the punch and die. They also aid in removing the part from the punch. Some examples of lubricants used in drawing operations are heavy-duty emulsions, phosphates, white lead, and wax films. Plastic films covering both sides of the part while used with a lubricant will leave the part with a fine surface.

== See also ==
- Circle grid analysis
- Forming limit diagram
- Rubber pad forming
- Stamping (metalworking)
