= International Deep Drawing Research Group =

International Deep Drawing Research Group (IDDRG)

== Background ==
The International Deep Drawing Research Group (IDDRG) focuses on sheet metal research in industry and academia. It was started 1957 as an organization of national groups. The original focus was on the fabrication of cups hence the name Deep Drawing Research Group. At the initial meeting the purpose was enlarged to do cooperative research on tests, materials, and processes. Such work included for example, methods for determining the strain hardening exponent n, the anisotropy-values (lankford coefficient), as well as other tests for sheet metal formability and, later, forming limit diagrams.

Starting in 1960, a schedule was established for working group meetings every year with open Congresses in every second, even numbered years. The working group meetings were closed sessions made up of delegations from the National Groups that comprised the IDDRG. The reason for these closed sessions was to allow experts to informally review critical issues related to materials, tests, and processes.

As some of the initial technical issues were resolved, the working groups became progressively more informal, and over the years became mini conferences. By 1998, it had become obvious that the former format of the IDDRG has to be changed. This evolution took time, but starting in 2003, the meeting schedule shifted to yearly Conferences with both regular papers and poster presentations that are included in conference proceedings.

== Mission ==
The Mission of the International Deep Drawing Research Group (IDDRG) is to co-ordinate research and development work in sheet metal forming, to bring together scientists, researchers and industrialists working on these fields all over the World, to provide open and scientifically highly acknowledged forum to its members to present their research and development findings on all aspects of sheet metal forming and certain related subjects.

The combination of technical presentations and opportunities for discussion are meant to stimulate thinking and to provide valuable interchange of ideas.

== Activities ==
Conferences are normally scheduled for May or June in Europe, North America or Asia. IDDRG 2026 conference was held at Indian Institute of Technology Bombay (IITB). However, most conferences are held in Europe because the majority of the current membership resides in Europe. Conferences start with an informal reception on Sunday evening followed by two and a half days of technical sessions. Ample time is allowed for technical discussion, and various social events are scheduled in association with the conference. Typical topics include machinery and press tools, new processes, new materials, experimental methods for evaluating formability and studying press operations, springback, constitutive equations, plasticity criteria, and friction and wear with attention to interface behavior as characterized by topography and surface chemistry, lubrication, speed, and temperature.

== Organization ==
The officers of the IDDRG are the current President, Vice-Presidents, General Secretary, Treasurer, and active Past-Presidents. The officers of the IDDRG comprise the Executive Committee. The vice-presidents are selected for their expertise and to represent, as far as possible, the geographic distribution of the member countries. Specific responsibilities of vice-presidents are to contact and represent the National delegations in their geographic area and to chair technical sessions at conferences.

== Member Countries ==
Member countries include: India, Australia, Austria, Belgium, Brazil, Canada, Czech Republic, China, Denmark, Finland, France, Germany, Hungary, Italy, Japan, Luxembourg, Netherlands, Norway, Portugal, Slovakia, Slovenia, South Korea, Spain, Sweden, Switzerland, and the United States.
