= Formability =

Formability is the ability of a given metal workpiece to undergo plastic deformation without being damaged. The plastic deformation capacity of metallic materials, however, is limited to a certain extent, at which point, the material could experience tearing or fracture (breakage).

Processes affected by the formability of a material include: rolling, extrusion, forging, rollforming, stamping, and hydroforming.

== Fracture strain ==
A general parameter that indicates the formability and ductility of a material is the fracture strain which is determined by a uniaxial tensile test (see also fracture toughness). The strain identified by this test is defined by elongation with respect to a reference length. For example, a length of 80 mm (3.1 in) is used for the standardized uniaxial test of flat specimens, pursuant to EN 10002. Deformation is homogeneous up to uniform elongation. Strain subsequently localizes until fracture occurs. Fracture strain is not an engineering strain since distribution of the deformation is inhomogeneous within the reference length. Fracture strain is nevertheless a rough indicator of the formability of a material. Typical values of the fracture strain are: 7% for ultra-high-strength material, and over 50% for mild-strength steel.

== Forming limits for sheet forming ==
One main failure mode is caused by tearing of the material. This is typical for sheet-forming applications. A neck may appear at a certain forming stage. This is an indication of localized plastic deformation. Whereas more or less homogeneous deformation takes place in and around the subsequent neck location in the early stable deformation stage, almost all deformation is concentrated in the neck zone during the quasi-stable and unstable deformation phase. This leads to material failure manifested by tearing. Forming-limit curves depict the extreme, but still possible, deformation which a sheet material may undergo during any stage of the stamping process. These limits depend on the deformation mode and the ratio of the surface strains. The major surface strain has a minimum value when plane strain deformation occurs, which means that the corresponding minor surface strain is zero. Forming limits are a specific material property. Typical plane strain values range from 10% for high-strength grades and 50% or above for mild-strength materials and those with very good formability. Forming limit diagrams are often used to graphically or mathematically represent formability. It is recognized by many authors that the nature of fracture and therefore the Forming limit diagrams are intrinsically non-deterministic since large variations might be observed even within a single experimental campaign.

== Deep drawability ==
A classic form of sheetforming is deep drawing, which is done by drawing a sheet by means of a punch tool pressing on the inner region of the sheet, whereas the side material held by a blankholder can be drawn toward the center. It has been observed that materials with outstanding deep drawability behave anisotropically (see: anisotropy). Plastic deformation in the surface is much more pronounced than in the thickness. The lankford coefficient (r) is a specific material property indicating the ratio between width deformation and thickness deformation in the uniaxial tensile test. Materials with very good deep drawability have an r value of 2 or below. The positive aspect of formability with respect to the forming limit curve (forming limit diagram) is seen in the deformation paths of the material that are concentrated in the extreme left of the diagram, where the forming limits become very large.

== Ductility ==
Another failure mode that may occur without any tearing is ductile fracture after plastic deformation (ductility). This may occur as a result of bending or shear deformation (inplane or through the thickness). The failure mechanism may be due to void nucleation and expansion on a microscopic level. Microcracks and subsequent macrocracks may appear when deformation of the material between the voids has exceeded the limit. Extensive research has focused in recent years on understanding and modeling ductile fracture. The approach has been to identify ductile forming limits using various small-scale tests that show different strain ratios or stress triaxialities. An effective measure of this type of forming limit is the minimum radius in roll-forming applications (half the sheet thickness for materials with good and three times the sheet thickness for materials with low formability).

== Use of formability parameters ==
Knowledge of the material formability is very important to the layout and design of any industrial forming process. Simulations using the finite-element method and use of formability criteria such as the forming limit curve (forming limit diagram) enhance and, in some cases, are indispensable to certain tool design processes (also see: Sheet metal forming simulation and Sheet metal forming analysis).

== IDDRG ==
One major objective of the International Deep Drawing Research Group (IDDRG, from 1957) is the investigation, exchange and dissemination of knowledge and experience about the formability of sheet materials.
