= Sheet metal forming analysis =

For sheet metal forming analysis within the metal forming process, a successful technique requires a non-contact optical 3D deformation measuring system. The system analyzes, calculates and documents deformations of sheet metal parts, for example. It provides the 3D coordinates of the component's surface as well as the distribution of major and minor strain on the surface and the material thickness reduction. In the Forming Limit Diagram, the measured deformations are compared to the material characteristics. The system supports optimization processes in sheet metal forming by means of;

- Fast detection of critical deformation areas
- Solving complex forming problems
- Verification of numerical simulations
- Verification of FE models
- Creation of Forming Limit Curves, FLC
- Comparison of measured deformations to the material characteristics by means of a Forming Limit Diagram.

The optical forming analysis with Forming analysis system provides for precise and fast measurement of small and large components using a high scanning density. Forming analysis system operates independently of the material. It can analyze components made from flat blanks, tubes or other components manufactured by an internal high pressure forming process (IHPF, Hydro forming).

== Functional principle explained by means of a standard measuring project ==
The forming analysis system compares the 3D positions of measuring points in a flat and in a deformed state.

Prior to the deformation, a regular point pattern is applied to the surface of the measuring object. For measuring objects which undergo high friction during the forming process, the measuring points are applied, for example, with the help of electrolytic methods. After the forming process of the measuring object, a camera (online or stand-alone operation) records the measuring points in several different images with different views.

Forming analysis system works with two point types.

In the Forming analysis system, the 3D computation of the measuring points is done using photogrammetric methods. For the automatic spatial orientation of the individual images or views, coded points are position close to or on the measuring object.

The basic idea of Photogrammetry is to look at points (coded and uncoded) from different directions and to calculate the 3D coordinates of these points from the images or point rays thus obtained. The points visible in an image have a fixed relation to each other. Therefore, by means of images made from other angles of view, it is possible to calculate the camera location using this point relation. During the acquisition of an image set it is the goal to record points from multiple different directions that show the largest possible angles (A, B, C) to each other.

It is the task of the Forming analysis system software to precisely find ellipses (a perspective view of point surfaces) in all images of the image set and their 3D orientation. The Forming analysis system software interprets the images and generates 3D measuring data.

In order to compute the strain, the flat state is compared to the deformed state. (#1 & #2) In a standard measuring project, the flat state, the strain reference, is not captured optically but results from the theoretical point distance defined in the project parameters. As a default, Forming analysis system presumes an exactly regular initial pattern which is on one plane and for which the point distance is known. This is called the "virtual reference stage" and is marked with Stage 0 in italic letters in the software. All strain values refer to the adjusted computation parameter Point distance. The Forming analysis system software is also capable of analyzing several static deformation states (stages) within one project where each deformation stage can be set as strain reference any time. This procedure may be used, for example, for the deformation analysis of tubes. To allow for a full-field view of the strain, the software changes to the so-called grid mode (#3 & #4). This means that based on the center points of the measuring points a grid surface is created. Each grid line intersection point represents a 3D measuring point. The full-field color representation of the strain results from the 3D positions of these grid line intersection points. (#5 & #6)
