= Sparton Horn Plant =

Auto-parts factory in Jackson, Michigan, USA

Sparton Horn Plant No. 5
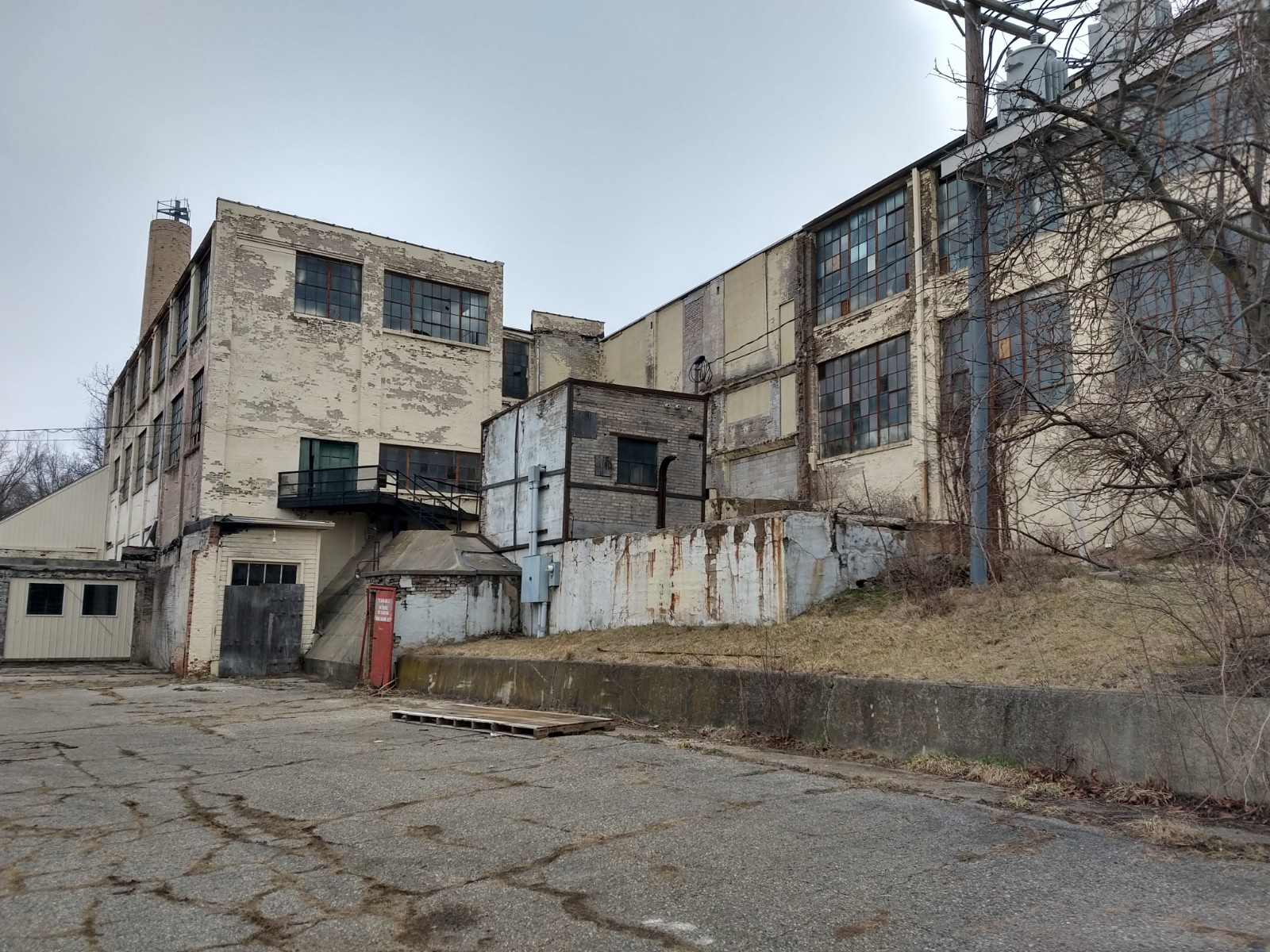
- The Sparton Complex, 2019
- Interactive map of the Sparton Horn Plant No. 5 area

General information
- Status: Demolished
- Type: Mixed Use Industrial
- Location: Jackson, Michigan, U.S.
- Coordinates: 42°15′36″N 84°24′24″W
- Construction started: 1909
- Completed: 1912

Technical details
- Floor area: 130,000 sq ft (12,000 m^{2})

Sparton Horn Plant was a factory in Jackson, Michigan in operation from 1909 to 2008. It made auto parts.

== Company ==
Sparks-Withington was founded in 1900 by William Sparks, as a subsidiary of Withington-Cooley & Co, the small company would begin making auto-parts, selling their heating and cooling ventilation systems by 1909.

In 1910 the company, needing room for expansion, would purchase the North St. property to construct their new Pressed Metal Parts and Auto Products factory; this would also come with the advent of their electric-car-horn in 1911, the product was named ‘Sparton’ a portmanteau of ‘Sparks’ and ‘Withington’. This innovation changed the course of Sparks-Withington, as their new product quickly began selling to Hudson Motor Car, and by 1920, 41 other auto manufacturers.

In the 1920’s the company would go on to create other appliances, including receivers, the first push-button-ignition,. and the first electric radio. Sparks-Withington’s bountiful sales, over twenty years, came with the construction of three more factories and the purchase of another

=== World War II and postwar activity ===
At the coming of World War II, Sparks-Withington began wartime production, fabricating their own variety of military equipment. This included, but was not limited to magazines and bombs.

Sparks-Withington’s post war production brought in the creation of black & white as well as on color television. In 1956 Sparks-Withington was rebranded as Sparton, named after their car horns. The Cold-War had begun, and in 1975 the US Navy had contracted Sparton to produce a military device called the ‘sonobuoy’, a specialized, acoustic buoy with the ability to detect enemy submarines; this device would evolve into DIFAR, leading Sparton to a district case in 2005, after the US government’s unlicensed use of the device.

By 1996 Sparton Corp. would divest their auto-division for $80 million, and in 2009, after three years of declining sales, Sparton sold all of their operational facilities and relocated to Schaumburg, Illinois. The company currently works in the fields of navy-technology, medical equipment, computer parts, and industrial engineering.

== Sparton Plant No. 5 ==
This complex began construction in 1909, consisting of two concrete, two-story structures, connected by a long single-story, steel-framed factory building; the factory structure was illuminated with eight sawtooth skylights, and large windows.

Sparks-Withington started branching out in the next few years, and in 1912 the factory was expanded; adding a larger two-story building, as well as a new boiler room with a smokestack. This addition was made of brick, steel, and wood and was built parallel to the original structure.

The space left between both factory buildings allowed railcars to dock on the second level of the new building. Loading docks were located on the east end of the complex, and extended out to Hamilton St. Over time, as Sparton’s sales began to decline, the factory finally closed.

=== Closure and fire ===
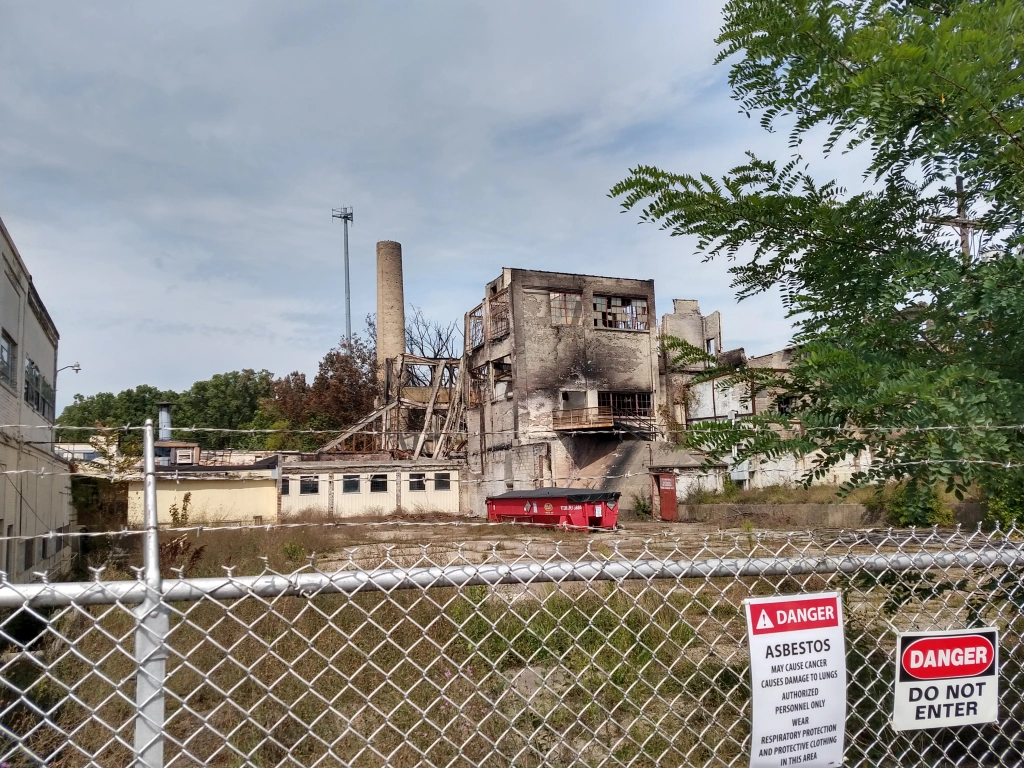
Sparton Horn Plant after the fire

After the site ceased operations in 2008, the building was sold to be used for mixed-use industrial space. Their North Street plant was leased for the next decade, before being sold for $79,000 at an online auction in 2023. Shortly after the acquisition the east-wing of the building was caught in an all-call-alarm fire, burning for nearly an hour; there were zero casualties, though four firefighters were reported to have suffered heat exhaustion.

News footage showed billowing, black smoke; the fire burning for nearly an hour, allowing steel beams to buckle and exterior walls to collapse. Within the aftermath EPA began to investigate the site, locating hazardous materials, such as asbestos, within the plume’s fallout.

This building was demolished for assessment and redevelopment in June 2025, after receiving a grant of $3,000,000.
