= Presence sensing device =

Foreign object detection

A presence sensing device (PSD) is a safety device for press brakes and similar metal-bending machines. The device operator often holds the sheet metal work-piece in one place while another portion of the piece is being formed in the die. If a foreign object is detected, the PSD immediately retracts the die or stops the motion of the ram. PSDs protect the operator and other employees in the area.

== Photoelectric sensors ==
One category of presence sensing devices are photoelectric sensors. Light curtains also fall into this category. Light curtains use many infrared light beams to form a perimeter around machinery. When two or more consecutively adjacent beams are interrupted, a kill-switch stops the machine until the boundary is reset. Light curtains must be placed in front of the work area. This makes it difficult for press brake operators to work on small parts. One cannot help but disrupt the beam. The operator might "mute" the light curtain in order to get the job done. Certain parts of the beam can be muted. For example, muting the front and rear of the beam allows the middle to offer continued protection for the operator. Additionally, it may be necessary to use auxiliary light beams if the operator will reach between the main light beams and the edge of certain machines.

== Electronic safety device ==
Electronic safety devices use lasers or cameras to sense a foreign object in the vicinity of the press brake. They are less obtrusive than other safety options, which means operators are less opposed to using them.

After some contention by the Occupational Safety and Health Administration (OSHA), an electronic safety device can fall under the PSD umbrella. One such device is the Laser Sentry press brake safety device designed by Glen Koedding in 2003. The concept was challenged with OSHA by a competitor almost immediately. OSHA responded by issuing a letter of disapproval stating that the Laser Sentry did not meet the “safe distance” rule. The rule states that a presence sensing protective device must be a minimum of 6 inches away from the nearest pinch point. However, after further observation, Laser Sentry was deemed a PSD in 2004, when used in conjunction with hydraulic press brakes.

Cameras are another electronic safety device used for press brake safety. The camera can detect an intrusion between the upper and lower dies. If an intrusion is detected, a signal will stop the downward movement of the ram. A camera safety system uses a linear scale to calculate the upper beam's position, velocity, and the stopping distance.

== Proper installation ==
A complete lack of machine guarding or improperly installed safety devices are the main causes of machining accidents. However, proper installation can greatly reduce this risk. Stop-time measurements can remove the guesswork from machine safety. The results of the test are applied to OSHA and American National Standards Institute (ANSI) formulas to ensure the proper installation distance of safety devices. Proper installation is a must and can be ensured by following the manuals provided by the manufacturer.

== Safety standards ==
Any machine safety device should be designed and built to the highest safety standards defined for machinery safety, EN 13849-1 Category 4, and meet the control reliability requirements of ANSI B11.19 and OSHA 1910.217.

Original equipment manufacturers (OEM's) often consider point-of-operation safety to be the user's responsibility. The best safety equipment can only go so far in protecting an operator from injury. Proper training is also imperative to keeping the press brake operator safe. Certification as a press brake operator is available.
