= Rubber pad forming =

Metalworking process

Rubber pad forming process, 1: bottom of the press. 2: lower die. 3: sheet metal. 4: rubber pad. 5: top of the press.

Rubber pad forming (RPF) is a metalworking process where sheet metal is pressed between a die and a rubber block, made of polyurethane. Under pressure, the rubber and sheet metal are driven into the die and conform to its shape, forming the part. The rubber pads can have a general purpose shape, like a membrane. Alternatively, they can be machined in the shape of die or punch.

Rubber pad forming is a deep drawing technique that is ideally suited for the production of small and medium-sized series. Deep drawing makes it possible to deform sheet metal in two directions, which offers great benefits in terms of function integration, weight reduction, cleanability and such.

The disadvantage of regular deep drawing is that expensive tools consisting of an upper and lower mold are needed. Once these tools have been made, the variable costs are low, which makes regular deep drawing very suitable for large and very large numbers of products.

== Technique ==
In the rubber pad forming process only a milled lower die is required on which a metal plate is placed. Afterwards, the shape of the lower die is pressed in the plate with the rubber mold. In most cases, the contour, hole patterns and the like will be cut with a 3D laser cutter.

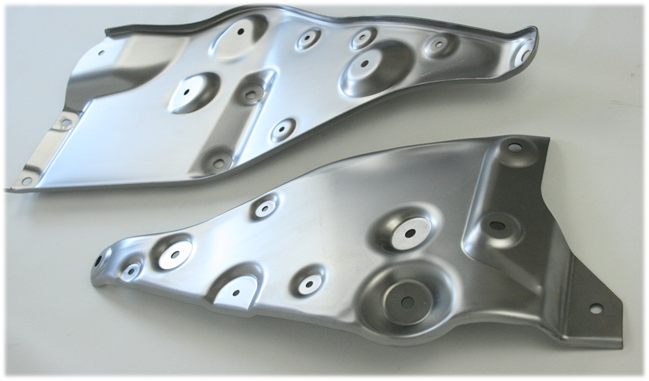
Rubber pad press formed product

The simplicity of the rubber press tool causes tooling costs to be around 85 to 90% lower than those of regular deep drawing while the variable costs are higher. This combination makes rubber pad pressing very suitable for smaller and medium-sized series (up to 5,000-10,000 pieces per year), even though traditional cutting, lace, welding, finishing etc. is used more due to the unfamiliarity with rubber pad forming.

Rubber pad forming has been used in production lines for many years. Up to 60% of all sheet metal parts in the aerospace industry are fabricated using this process. The most relevant applications are indeed in the aerospace field. It is frequently used in prototyping shops and for the production of kitchenware. For a decade, rubber pad pressing has developed greatly into a widely used technology for many industrial applications.

== Pressing power ==
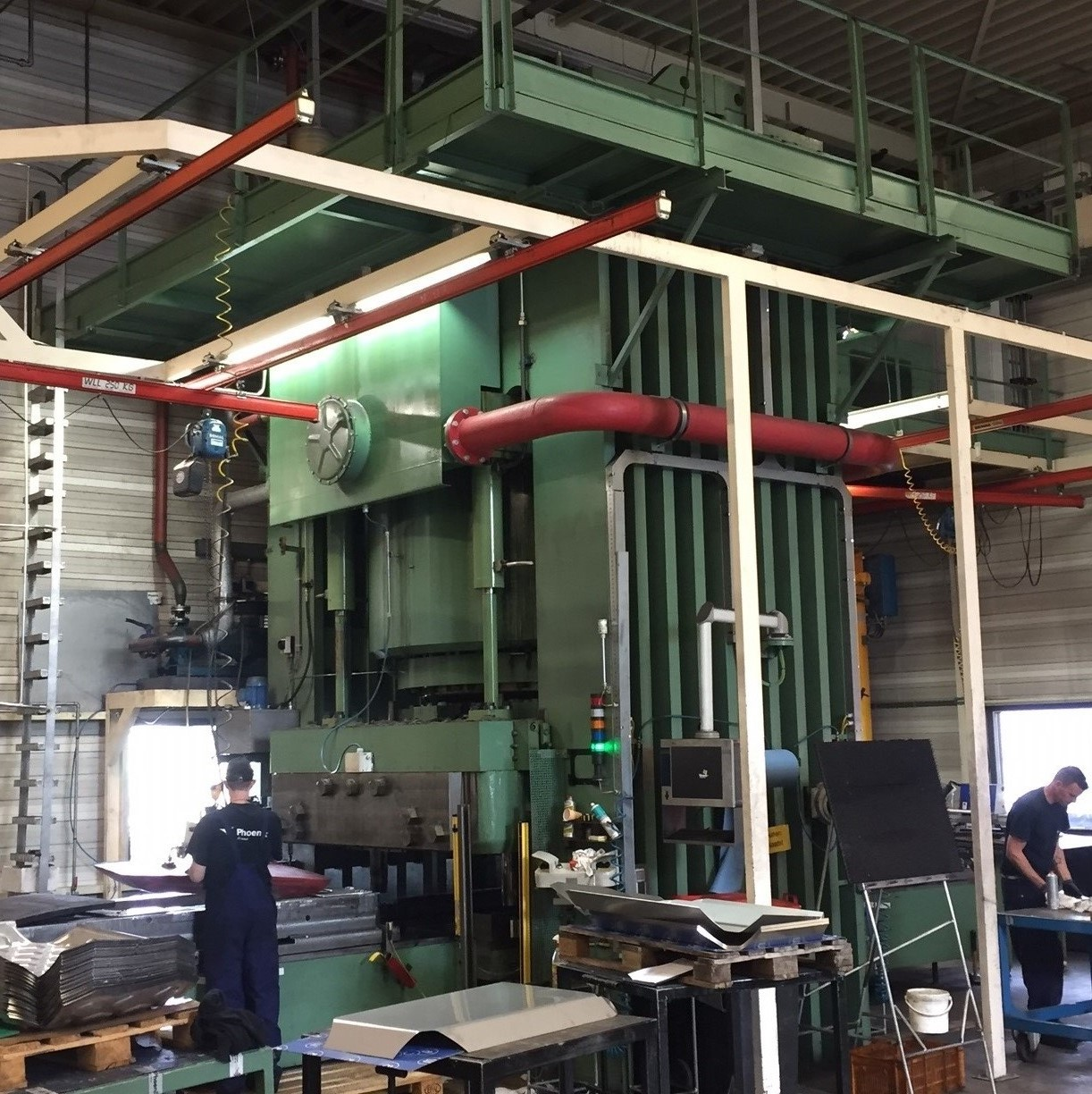
8000 tons rubber pad press

Enormous pressing forces are required for the rubber presses to work. In the Netherlands there are several rubber pad presses, of which the largest one has a press force of no less than 8,000 tons with a maximum surface area of 1.10x2.20m, these presses are used for very diverse industrial applications.

Worldwide, presses are in use up to about 14,000 tonnes.

== Pros and cons ==
In summary, the benefits of rubber pad pressing are:

- Short time to market through simple tools
- Low tooling costs
- Excellent for low and medium numbers
- With the use of rubber, a polished or sharpened surface remains undamaged
- Suitable for steel, stainless steel, aluminum etc. up to a thickness of about 4mm

And the disadvantages:

- For very large numbers too laborable so too expensive
- Somewhat less freedom in form compared to the regular deep drawing process
- In most cases not suitable for sheet thicknesses greater than 4mm.

== Definition ==
Rubber pad forming can be accomplished in many different ways, and as technology has advanced, so have the applications for this simple process. In general, an elastic upper die, usually made of rubber, is connected to a hydraulic press. A rigid lower die, often called a form block, provides the mold for the sheeted metal to be formed to. Because the upper (male) die can be used with separate lower (female) dies, the process is relatively cheap and flexible. The worked metal is not worn as quickly as in more conventional processes such as deep drawing, however, rubber pads exert less pressure in the same circumstances as non-elastic parts, which may lead to less definition in forming, and rubber pads wear more quickly than steel parts.

=== The Guerin process ===
The Guerin process, also called Guerin Stamping, is a manufacturing process used in the shaping of sheet metals. It is the oldest and most basic of the production rubber-pad forming processes. It was developed in the late 1930s by Henry Guerin, an employee of the Douglas Aircraft Co. in California. Thereafter, it was used extensively by all major aircraft manufacturers to shape the many complex shapes inherent in the design of aircraft.

== Variants and similar processes ==
- Deep drawing
- Hydroforming
- Verson-Wheelon process
- Marform process
- Hydrobuckling
- Aquadraw hydraulic process
