= Electrohydraulic forming =

Electrohydraulic forming is a type of metal forming process in which an electric arc discharge in liquid is used to convert electrical energy to mechanical energy and change the shape of the workpiece. A capacitor bank delivers a pulse of high current across two electrodes, which are positioned a short distance apart while submerged in a fluid (water or oil). The electric arc discharge rapidly vaporizes the surrounding fluid, creating a shock wave. The workpiece, which is kept in contact with the fluid, is deformed into an evacuated die.

The potential forming capabilities of submerged arc discharge processes were recognized as early as the mid-1940s (Yutkin L.A.). During the 1950s and early 1960s, the basic process was developed into production systems. This work principally was by and for the aerospace industries. By 1970, forming machines based on submerged arc discharge were available from machine tool builders. A few of the larger aerospace fabricators built machines of their own design to meet specific part fabrication requirements.

Electrohydraulic forming (EHF) is based on the ultra-high-speed deformation of metal using shockwaves in water. Using the discharge of current from a capacitor bank, an electric arc is generated in water between two electrodes. This electric arc vaporizes the surrounding water, converting electrical energy into an intense shockwave of mechanical energy.

The shockwave simultaneously transforms the metal workpiece into a visco-plastic state and accelerates it into a die, enabling forming of complex shapes at high speeds in cold conditions. All of which happens in a matter of milliseconds; total cycle time of seconds including charging time of the system. This process is not limited by size and allows forming of parts up to a few square meters in size. An array of electrodes can be placed over a large workpiece, enabling pressure distribution according to the product’s topology, still using a one-sided die to create complex shapes and fine details.

Very large capacitor banks are needed to produce the same amount of energy as a modest mass of high explosives - which is expensive for large parts. On the other hand, the electrohydraulic method was seen as better suited to automation because of the fine control of multiple, sequential energy discharges and the relative compactness of the electrode-media containment system.

Advantages of EHF

- A single-step process (rather than progressive stamping)
- Fine details and sharp lines can be easily formed
- Forming of male and female shapes (negative and positive)
- Only a single one-sided die is required
- Enables extremely deep forming (much more than is possible with conventional stamping)
- Even distribution and higher strength of thin material
- Extremely fast
- Equipment has small footprint
- No need for a press – the forming chamber is a self-balanced system
- Allows forming of parts up to a few square meters in size

== See also ==
- Ignitron
- Hydroforming
