= Tonnage monitor =

A tonnage monitor is a meter used on a stamping press to measure the force applied by the ram. In a press, the cutting and forming tools in the die will wear down, requiring increasing effort to stamp the part. A tonnage monitor allows the user to observe this degradation and decide when it is time to sharpen and adjust the die. It generally uses strain gauges attached to the frame or tie rods of the press. The gauges provide an electric signal by means of piezoelectric effect as they are stretched during press operation.

The tonnage monitor may provide any of the following additional features:

- Warning indication when the load exceeds a setpoint
- A press stop signal to halt the press at the top of the stroke for when the load exceeds a set point. This signal is generally used to watch for sudden events such as a tool breaking or a part becoming jammed.
- Recording of successive press hits to show the operational trend
- Graphing of a single stroke. With a progressive die, such a graph can be used by the tool and diemaker to view the operation of the different cutting pieces and thereby optimize tool performance.
