= Backgauge =

A backgauge is a mechanical system, normally attached to a brake press. Its main function is to interface with the brake press computer numerical control (CNC), moving along several different axes in order to precisely position a piece of metal for forming.

Backgauges typically have anywhere from 1 to 6 axes of movement. Each of these individual axes is controlled by a separate electric motor. Often a brake press is sold to a customer in conjunction with a backgauge.

On an extrusion saw, a backgauge is responsible for feeding material at exact amounts past a saw blade. It is responsible for the accuracy of the piece's cut length.
