= Sheet metal =

Metal formed into thin, flat pieces

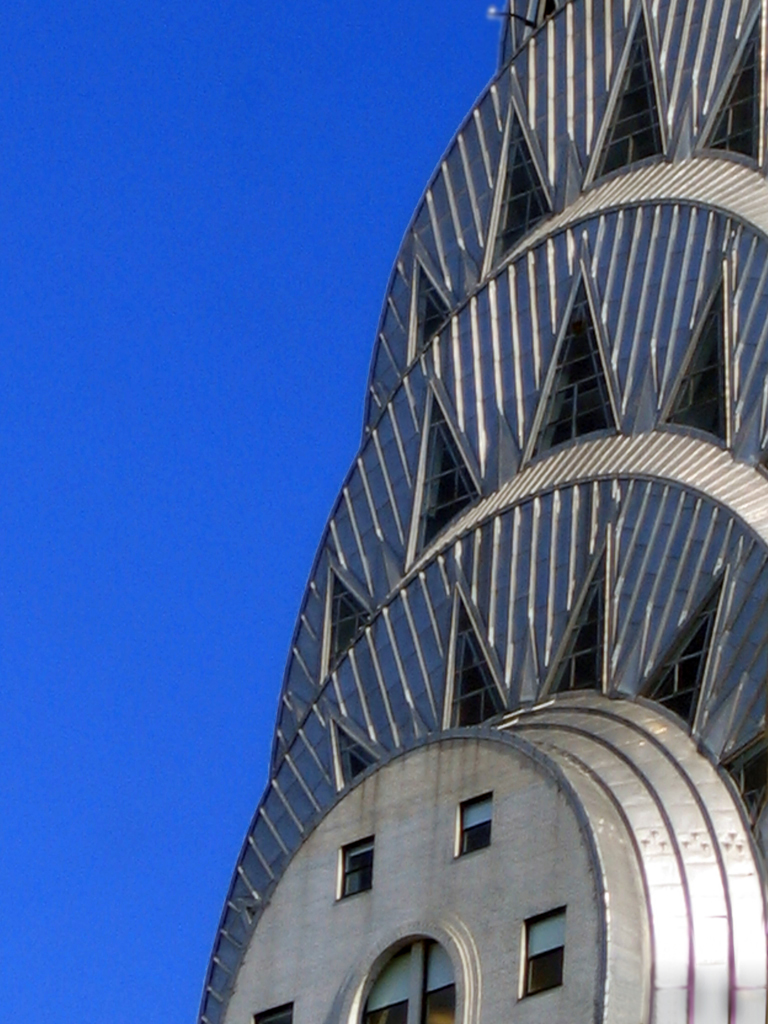
Sheets of Nirosta stainless steel cover the Chrysler Building.

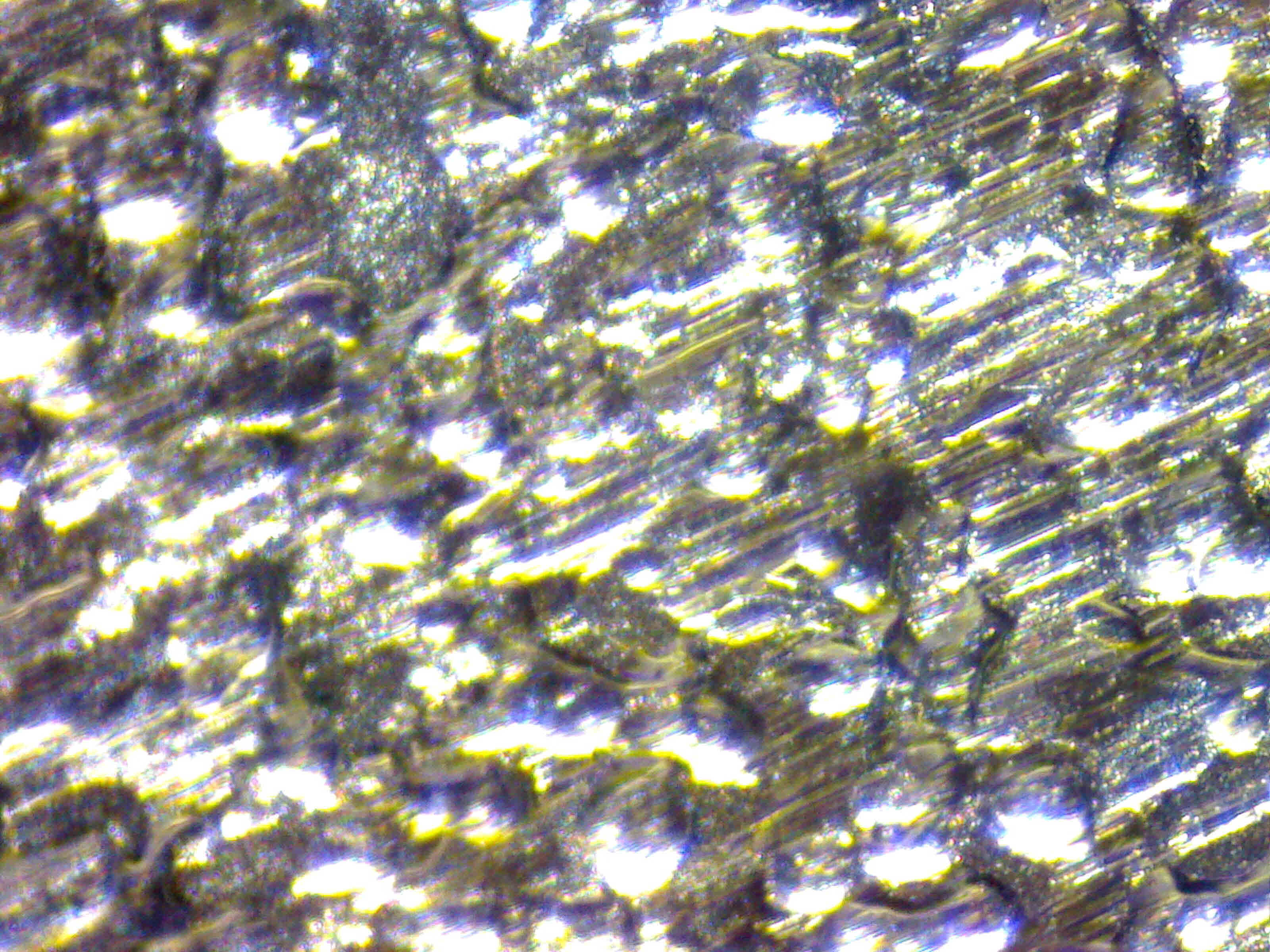
Microscopic close-up of mild steel sheet metal

Sheet metal is metal formed into thin, flat pieces, usually by an industrial process.

Thicknesses can vary significantly; extremely thin sheets are considered foil or leaf, and pieces thicker than 6 mm (0.25 in) are considered plate, such as plate steel, a class of structural steel.

Sheet metal is available in flat pieces or coiled strips. The coils are formed by running a continuous sheet of metal through a roll slitter.

In most of the world, sheet metal thickness is consistently specified in millimeters. In the US, the thickness of sheet metal is commonly specified by a traditional, non-linear measure known as its gauge. The larger the gauge number, the thinner the metal. Commonly used steel sheet metal ranges from 30 gauge (0.40 mm or 0.016 in) to about 7 gauge (4.55 mm or 0.179 in). Gauge differs between ferrous (iron-based) metals and nonferrous metals such as aluminum or copper. Copper thickness, for example, is traditionally measured in ounces in the US, representing the weight of copper contained in an area of one square foot. Parts manufactured from sheet metal must maintain a uniform thickness for ideal results.

There are many different metals that can be made into sheet metal, such as aluminium, brass, copper, steel, tin, nickel and titanium. For decorative uses, some important sheet metals include silver, gold, and platinum (platinum sheet metal is also utilized as a catalyst). These metal sheets are processed through different processing technologies, mainly including cold rolling and hot rolling. Sometimes hot-dip galvanizing process is adopted as needed to prevent it from rusting due to constant exposure to the outdoors. Sometimes a layer of color coating is applied to the surface of the cold-rolled sheet to obtain a decorative and protective metal sheet, generally called a color-coated metal sheet.

Sheet metal is used in automobile and truck (lorry) bodies, major appliances, airplane fuselages and wings, tinplate for tin cans, roofing for buildings (architecture), and many other applications. Sheet metal of iron and other materials with high magnetic permeability, also known as laminated steel cores, has applications in transformers and electric machines. Historically, an important use of sheet metal was in plate armor worn by cavalry, and sheet metal continues to have many decorative uses, including in horse tack. Sheet metal workers are also known as "tin bashers" (or "tin knockers"), a name derived from the hammering of panel seams when installing tin roofs.

== History ==
Hand-hammered metal sheets have been used since ancient times for architectural purposes. Water-powered rolling mills replaced the manual process in the late 17th century. The process of flattening metal sheets required large rotating iron cylinders which pressed metal pieces into sheets. The metals suited for this were lead, copper, zinc, iron and later steel. Tin was often used to coat iron and steel sheets to prevent rust. This tin-coated sheet metal was called "tinplate". Sheet metals appeared in the United States in the 1870s, being used for shingle roofing, stamped ornamental ceilings, and exterior façades. Sheet metal ceilings were only popularly known as "tin ceilings" later as manufacturers of the period did not use the term. The popularity of both shingles and ceilings encouraged widespread production. With further advances of steel sheet metal production in the 1890s, the promise of being cheap, durable, easy to install, lightweight and fireproof gave the middle-class a significant appetite for sheet metal products. It was not until the 1930s and World War Two that metals became scarce and the sheet metal industry began to collapse. However, some American companies, such as the W.F. Norman Corporation, were able to stay in business by making other products until historic preservation projects aided the revival of ornamental sheet metal.

== Materials ==
=== Steel ===
Low-carbon steel is fabricated as sheet, and often galvanized.

=== Stainless steel ===
Grade 304 is the most common of the three grades. It offers good corrosion resistance while maintaining formability and weldability. Available finishes are #2B, #3, and #4. Grade 303 is not available in sheet form.

Grade 316 possesses more corrosion resistance and strength at elevated temperatures than 304. It is commonly used for pumps, valves, chemical equipment, and marine applications. Available finishes are #2B, #3, and #4.

Grade 410 is a heat treatable stainless steel, but it has a lower corrosion resistance than the other grades. It is commonly used in cutlery. The only available finish is dull.

Grade 430 is a popular grade, low-cost alternative to series 300's grades. This is used when high corrosion resistance is not a primary criterion. Common grade for appliance products, often with a brushed finish.

=== Aluminium ===
Aluminium is widely used in sheet metal form due to its flexibility, wide range of options, cost effectiveness, and other properties. The four most common aluminium grades available as sheet metal are 1100-H14, 3003-H14, 5052-H32, and 6061-T6.

Grade 1100-H14 is commercially pure aluminium, highly chemical and weather resistant. It is ductile enough for deep drawing and weldable, but has low strength. It is commonly used in chemical processing equipment, light reflectors, and jewelry.

Grade 3003-H14 is stronger than 1100, while maintaining the same formability and low cost. It is corrosion resistant and weldable. It is often used in stampings, spun and drawn parts, mail boxes, cabinets, tanks, and fan blades.

Grade 5052-H32 is much stronger than 3003 while still maintaining good formability. It maintains high corrosion resistance and weldability. Common applications include electronic chassis, tanks, and pressure vessels.

Grade 6061-T6 is a common heat-treated structural aluminium alloy. It is weldable, corrosion resistant, and stronger than 5052, but not as formable. It loses some of its strength when welded. It is used in modern aircraft structures.

=== Brass ===
Brass is an alloy of copper, which is widely used as a sheet metal. It has more strength, corrosion resistance and formability when compared to copper while retaining its conductivity.

In sheet hydroforming, variation in incoming sheet coil properties is a common problem for forming process, especially with materials for automotive applications. Even though incoming sheet coil may meet tensile test specifications, high rejection rate is often observed in production due to inconsistent material behavior. Thus there is a strong need for a discriminating method for testing incoming sheet material formability. The hydraulic sheet bulge test emulates biaxial deformation conditions commonly seen in production operations.

For forming limit curves of materials aluminium, mild steel and brass. Theoretical analysis is carried out by deriving governing equations for determining of equivalent stress and equivalent strain based on the bulging to be spherical and Tresca's yield criterion with the associated flow rule. For experimentation circular grid analysis is one of the most effective methods.

== Gauge ==
Use of gauge numbers to designate sheet metal thickness is discouraged by numerous international standards organizations. For example, ASTM states in specification ASTM A480-10a: "The use of gauge number is discouraged as being an archaic term of limited usefulness not having general agreement on meaning."

Manufacturers' Standard Gauge for Sheet Steel is based on an average density of 41.82 pounds per square foot per inch thick, equivalent to 501.84 lb/cu ft (8,038.7 kg/m^{3}). The older United States Standard Gauge is based upon 40 pounds per square foot per inch thick. Gauge is defined differently for ferrous (iron-based) and non-ferrous metals (e.g. aluminium and brass).

The gauge thicknesses shown in column 2 (US standard sheet and plate iron and steel decimal inch (mm)) seem somewhat arbitrary. The progression of thicknesses is clear in column 3 (US standard for sheet and plate iron and steel 64ths inch (delta)). The thicknesses vary first by 1/32 inch in higher thicknesses and then step down to increments of 1/64 inch, then 1/128 inch, with the final increments at decimal fractions of 1/64 inch.

Some steel tubes are manufactured by folding a single steel sheet into a square/circle and welding the seam together. Their wall thickness has a similar (but distinct) gauge to the thickness of steel sheets.

Standard sheet metal gauges
Gauge	US standard for sheet and plate iron and steel		Mfr Std Gauge for Sheet Steel inch (mm)	Galvanized steel inch (mm)	Stainless steel inch (mm)	Steel Tube Wall Thickness inch (mm)	Aluminium inch (mm)	Zinc inch (mm)
Gauge	dec. in. (mm)	1/64 in (delta)	Mfr Std Gauge for Sheet Steel inch (mm)	Galvanized steel inch (mm)	Stainless steel inch (mm)	Steel Tube Wall Thickness inch (mm)	Aluminium inch (mm)	Zinc inch (mm)
0000000	0.5000 (12.70)	32 (−)	—N/a	—N/a	—N/a	—N/a	—N/a	—N/a
000000	0.4688 (11.91)	30 (−2)	—N/a	—N/a	—N/a	—N/a	—N/a	—N/a
00000	0.4375 (11.11)	28 (−2)	—N/a	—N/a	—N/a	—N/a	—N/a	—N/a
0000	0.4063 (10.32)	26 (−2)	—N/a	—N/a	—N/a	—N/a	—N/a	—N/a
000	0.3750 (9.53)	24 (−2)	—N/a	—N/a	—N/a	—N/a	—N/a	—N/a
00	0.3438 (8.73)	22 (−2)	—N/a	—N/a	—N/a	0.380 (9.7)	—N/a	—N/a
0	0.3125 (7.94)	20 (−2)	—N/a	—N/a	—N/a	0.340 (8.6)	—N/a	—N/a
1	0.2813 (7.15)	18 (−2)	—N/a	—N/a	—N/a	0.300 (7.6)	—N/a	—N/a
2	0.2656 (6.75)	17 (−1)	—N/a	—N/a	—N/a	0.284 (7.2)	—N/a	—N/a
3	0.2500 (6.35)	16 (−1)	0.2391 (6.07)	—N/a	—N/a	0.259 (6.6)	—N/a	0.006 (0.15)
4	0.2344 (5.95)	15 (−1)	0.2242 (5.69)	—N/a	—N/a	0.238 (6.0)	—N/a	0.008 (0.20)
5	0.2188 (5.56)	14 (−1)	0.2092 (5.31)	—N/a	—N/a	0.220 (5.6)	—N/a	0.010 (0.25)
6	0.2031 (5.16)	13 (−1)	0.1943 (4.94)	—N/a	—N/a	0.203 (5.2)	0.162 (4.1)	0.012 (0.30)
7	0.1875 (4.76)	12 (−1)	0.1793 (4.55)	—N/a	0.1875 (4.76)	0.180 (4.6)	0.1443 (3.67)	0.014 (0.36)
8	0.1719 (4.37)	11 (−1)	0.1644 (4.18)	0.1681 (4.27)	0.1719 (4.37)	0.165 (4.2)	0.1285 (3.26)	0.016 (0.41)
9	0.1563 (3.97)	10 (−1)	0.1495 (3.80)	0.1532 (3.89)	0.1563 (3.97)	0.148 (3.8)	0.1144 (2.91)	0.018 (0.46)
10	0.1406 (3.57)	9 (−1)	0.1345 (3.42)	0.1382 (3.51)	0.1406 (3.57)	0.134 (3.4)	0.1019 (2.59)	0.020 (0.51)
11	0.1250 (3.18)	8 (−1)	0.1196 (3.04)	0.1233 (3.13)	0.1250 (3.18)	0.120 (3.0)	0.0907 (2.30)	0.024 (0.61)
12	0.1094 (2.78)	7 (−1)	0.1046 (2.66)	0.1084 (2.75)	0.1094 (2.78)	0.109 (2.8)	0.0808 (2.05)	0.028 (0.71)
13	0.0938 (2.38)	6 (−1)	0.0897 (2.28)	0.0934 (2.37)	0.094 (2.4)	0.095 (2.4)	0.072 (1.8)	0.032 (0.81)
14	0.0781 (1.98)	5 (−1)	0.0747 (1.90)	0.0785 (1.99)	0.0781 (1.98)	0.083 (2.1)	0.063 (1.6)	0.036 (0.91)
15	0.0703 (1.79)	4.5 (−0.5)	0.0673 (1.71)	0.0710 (1.80)	0.07 (1.8)	0.072 (1.8)	0.057 (1.4)	0.040 (1.0)
16	0.0625 (1.59)	4.0 (−0.5)	0.0598 (1.52)	0.0635 (1.61)	0.0625 (1.59)	0.065 (1.7)	0.0508 (1.29)	0.045 (1.1)
17	0.0563 (1.43)	3.6 (−0.4)	0.0538 (1.37)	0.0575 (1.46)	0.056 (1.4)	0.058 (1.5)	0.045 (1.1)	0.050 (1.3)
18	0.0500 (1.27)	3.2 (−0.4)	0.0478 (1.21)	0.0516 (1.31)	0.0500 (1.27)	0.049 (1.2)	0.0403 (1.02)	0.055 (1.4)
19	0.0438 (1.11)	2.8 (−0.4)	0.0418 (1.06)	0.0456 (1.16)	0.044 (1.1)	0.042 (1.1)	0.036 (0.91)	0.060 (1.5)
20	0.0375 (0.95)	2.4 (−0.4)	0.0359 (0.91)	0.0396 (1.01)	0.0375 (0.95)	0.035 (0.89)	0.0320 (0.81)	0.070 (1.8)
21	0.0344 (0.87)	2.2 (−0.2)	0.0329 (0.84)	0.0366 (0.93)	0.034 (0.86)	0.032 (0.81)	0.028 (0.71)	0.080 (2.0)
22	0.0313 (0.80)	2.0 (−0.2)	0.0299 (0.76)	0.0336 (0.85)	0.031 (0.79)	0.028 (0.71)	0.025 (0.64)	0.090 (2.3)
23	0.0281 (0.71)	1.8 (−0.2)	0.0269 (0.68)	0.0306 (0.78)	0.028 (0.71)	0.025 (0.64)	0.023 (0.58)	0.100 (2.5)
24	0.0250 (0.64)	1.6 (−0.2)	0.0239 (0.61)	0.0276 (0.70)	0.025 (0.64)	0.022 (0.56)	0.02 (0.51)	0.125 (3.2)
25	0.0219 (0.56)	1.4 (−0.2)	0.0209 (0.53)	0.0247 (0.63)	0.022 (0.56)	—N/a	0.018 (0.46)	—N/a
26	0.0188 (0.48)	1.2 (−0.2)	0.0179 (0.45)	0.0217 (0.55)	0.019 (0.48)	—N/a	0.017 (0.43)	—N/a
27	0.0172 (0.44)	1.1 (−0.1)	0.0164 (0.42)	0.0202 (0.51)	0.017 (0.43)	—N/a	0.014 (0.36)	—N/a
28	0.0156 (0.40)	1.0 (−0.1)	0.0149 (0.38)	0.0187 (0.47)	0.016 (0.41)	—N/a	0.0126 (0.32)	—N/a
29	0.0141 (0.36)	0.9 (−0.1)	0.0135 (0.34)	0.0172 (0.44)	0.014 (0.36)	—N/a	0.0113 (0.29)	—N/a
30	0.0125 (0.32)	0.8 (−0.1)	0.0120 (0.30)	0.0157 (0.40)	0.013 (0.33)	—N/a	0.0100 (0.25)	—N/a
31	0.0109 (0.28)	0.7 (−0.1)	0.0105 (0.27)	0.0142 (0.36)	0.011 (0.28)	—N/a	0.0089 (0.23)	—N/a
32	0.0102 (0.26)	0.65 (−0.05)	0.0097 (0.25)	—N/a	—N/a	—N/a	—N/a	—N/a
33	0.0094 (0.24)	0.60 (−0.05)	0.0090 (0.23)	—N/a	—N/a	—N/a	—N/a	—N/a
34	0.0086 (0.22)	0.55 (−0.05)	0.0082 (0.21)	—N/a	—N/a	—N/a	—N/a	—N/a
35	0.0078 (0.20)	0.50 (−0.05)	0.0075 (0.19)	—N/a	—N/a	—N/a	—N/a	—N/a
36	0.0070 (0.18)	0.45 (−0.05)	0.0067 (0.17)	—N/a	—N/a	—N/a	—N/a	—N/a
37	0.0066 (0.17)	0.425 (−0.025)	0.0064 (0.16)	—N/a	—N/a	—N/a	—N/a	—N/a
38	0.0063 (0.16)	0.400 (−0.025)	0.0060 (0.15)	—N/a	—N/a	—N/a	—N/a	—N/a

=== Tolerances ===
During the rolling process the rollers bow slightly, which results in the sheets being thinner on the edges. The tolerances in the table and attachments reflect current manufacturing practices and commercial standards and are not representative of the Manufacturer's Standard Gauge, which has no inherent tolerances.

Steel sheet metal tolerances
Gauge	Thickness		
Gauge	Nominal [in (mm)]	Max [in (mm)]	Min [in (mm)]
10	0.1345 (3.42)	0.1405 (3.57)	0.1285 (3.26)
11	0.1196 (3.04)	0.1256 (3.19)	0.1136 (2.89)
12	0.1046 (2.66)	0.1106 (2.81)	0.0986 (2.50)
14	0.0747 (1.90)	0.0797 (2.02)	0.0697 (1.77)
16	0.0598 (1.52)	0.0648 (1.65)	0.0548 (1.39)
18	0.0478 (1.21)	0.0518 (1.32)	0.0438 (1.11)
20	0.0359 (0.91)	0.0389 (0.99)	0.0329 (0.84)
22	0.0299 (0.76)	0.0329 (0.84)	0.0269 (0.68)
24	0.0239 (0.61)	0.0269 (0.68)	0.0209 (0.53)
26	0.0179 (0.45)	0.0199 (0.51)	0.0159 (0.40)
28	0.0149 (0.38)	0.0169 (0.43)	0.0129 (0.33)

Aluminium sheet metal tolerances
Thickness [in (mm)]	Sheet width	
Thickness [in (mm)]	36 (914.4) [in (mm)]	48 (1,219) [in (mm)]
0.018–0.028 (0.46–0.71)	0.002 (0.051)	0.0025 (0.064)
0.029–0.036 (0.74–0.91)	0.002 (0.051)	0.0025 (0.064)
0.037–0.045 (0.94–1.14)	0.0025 (0.064)	0.003 (0.076)
0.046–0.068 (1.2–1.7)	0.003 (0.076)	0.004 (0.10)
0.069–0.076 (1.8–1.9)	0.003 (0.076)	0.004 (0.10)
0.077–0.096 (2.0–2.4)	0.0035 (0.089)	0.004 (0.10)
0.097–0.108 (2.5–2.7)	0.004 (0.10)	0.005 (0.13)
0.109–0.125 (2.8–3.2)	0.0045 (0.11)	0.005 (0.13)
0.126–0.140 (3.2–3.6)	0.0045 (0.11)	0.005 (0.13)
0.141–0.172 (3.6–4.4)	0.006 (0.15)	0.008 (0.20)
0.173–0.203 (4.4–5.2)	0.007 (0.18)	0.010 (0.25)
0.204–0.249 (5.2–6.3)	0.009 (0.23)	0.011 (0.28)

Stainless steel sheet metal tolerances
Thickness [in (mm)]	Sheet width	
Thickness [in (mm)]	36 (914.4) [in (mm)]	48 (1,219) [in (mm)]
0.017–0.030 (0.43–0.76)	0.0015 (0.038)	0.002 (0.051)
0.031–0.041 (0.79–1.04)	0.002 (0.051)	0.003 (0.076)
0.042–0.059 (1.1–1.5)	0.003 (0.076)	0.004 (0.10)
0.060–0.073 (1.5–1.9)	0.003 (0.076)	0.0045 (0.11)
0.074–0.084 (1.9–2.1)	0.004 (0.10)	0.0055 (0.14)
0.085–0.099 (2.2–2.5)	0.004 (0.10)	0.006 (0.15)
0.100–0.115 (2.5–2.9)	0.005 (0.13)	0.007 (0.18)
0.116–0.131 (2.9–3.3)	0.005 (0.13)	0.0075 (0.19)
0.132–0.146 (3.4–3.7)	0.006 (0.15)	0.009 (0.23)
0.147–0.187 (3.7–4.7)	0.007 (0.18)	0.0105 (0.27)

== Forming processes ==
=== Bending ===
The equation for estimating the maximum bending force is,
$$F_\text{max} = k \frac{TLt^{2}}{W},$$
where

- k is a factor taking into account several parameters including friction;
- T is the ultimate tensile strength of the metal;
- L and t are the length and thickness of the sheet metal, respectively; and
- W is the open width of a V-die or wiping die.

=== Curling ===
The curling process is used to form an edge on a ring. This process is used to remove sharp edges. It also increases the moment of inertia near the curled end. The flare/burr should be turned away from the die. It is used to curl a material of specific thickness. Tool steel is generally used due to the amount of wear done by operation.

=== Decambering ===
It is a metal working process of removing camber, the horizontal bend, from a strip shaped material. It may be done to a finite length section or coils. It resembles flattening of leveling process, but on a deformed edge.

=== Deep drawing ===
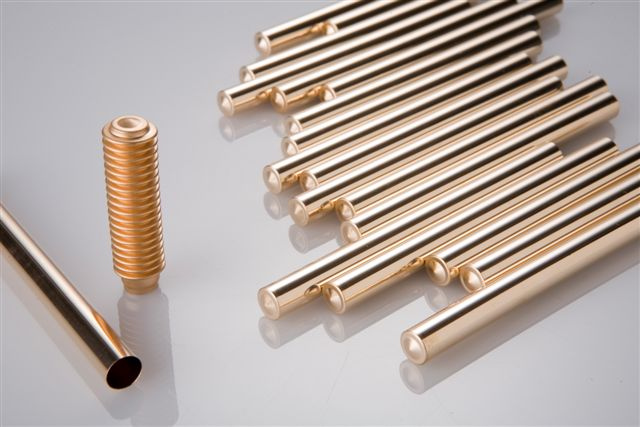
Example of deep drawn part

Drawing is a forming process in which the metal is stretched over a form or die. In deep drawing the depth of the part being made is more than half its diameter. Deep drawing is used for making automotive fuel tanks, kitchen sinks, two-piece aluminum cans, etc. Deep drawing is generally done in multiple steps called draw reductions. The greater the depth, the more reductions are required. Deep drawing may also be accomplished with fewer reductions by heating the workpiece, for example in sink manufacture.

In many cases, material is rolled at the mill in both directions to aid in deep drawing. This leads to a more uniform grain structure which limits tearing and is referred to as "draw quality" material.

=== Expanding ===
Expanding is a process of cutting or stamping slits in alternating pattern much like the stretcher bond in brickwork and then stretching the sheet open in accordion-like fashion. It is used in applications where air and water flow are desired as well as when light weight is desired at cost of a solid flat surface. A similar process is used in other materials such as paper to create a low cost packing paper with better supportive properties than flat paper alone.

=== Hemming and seaming ===
Hemming is a process of folding the edge of sheet metal onto itself to reinforce that edge. Seaming is a process of folding two sheets of metal together to form a joint.

=== Hydroforming ===
Hydroforming is a process that is analogous to deep drawing, in that the part is formed by stretching the blank over a stationary die. The force required is generated by the direct application of extremely high hydrostatic pressure to the workpiece or to a bladder that is in contact with the workpiece, rather than by the movable part of a die in a mechanical or hydraulic press. Unlike deep drawing, hydroforming usually does not involve draw reductions—the piece is formed in a single step.

=== Incremental sheet forming ===
Incremental sheet forming or ISF forming process is basically sheet metal working or sheet metal forming process. In this case, sheet is formed into final shape by a series of processes in which small incremental deformation can be done in each series.

=== Ironing ===
Ironing is a sheet metal working or sheet metal forming process. It uniformly thins the workpiece in a specific area. This is a very useful process. It is used to produce a uniform wall thickness part with a high height-to-diameter ratio. It is used in making aluminium beverage cans.

=== Laser cutting ===
Sheet metal can be cut in various ways, from hand tools called tin snips up to very large powered shears. With the advances in technology, sheet metal cutting has turned to computers for precise cutting. Many sheet metal cutting operations are based on computer numerically controlled (CNC) laser cutting or multi-tool CNC punch press.

CNC laser involves moving a lens assembly carrying a beam of laser light over the surface of the metal. Oxygen, nitrogen or air is fed through the same nozzle from which the laser beam exits. The metal is heated and burnt by the laser beam, cutting the metal sheet. The quality of the edge can be mirror smooth and a precision of around 0.1 mm (0.0039 in) can be obtained. Cutting speeds on thin 1.2 mm (0.047 in) sheet can be as high as 25 m (82 ft) per minute. Most laser cutting systems use a CO_{2} based laser source with a wavelength of around 10 μm; some more recent systems use a YAG based laser with a wavelength of around 1 μm.

=== Photochemical machining ===
Photochemical machining, also known as photo etching, is a tightly controlled corrosion process which is used to produce complex metal parts from sheet metal with very fine detail. The photo etching process involves photo sensitive polymer being applied to a raw metal sheet. Using CAD designed photo-tools as stencils, the metal is exposed to UV light to leave a design pattern, which is developed and etched from the metal sheet.

=== Perforating ===
Perforating is a cutting process that punches multiple small holes close together in a flat workpiece. Perforated sheet metal is used to make a wide variety of surface cutting tools, such as the surform.

=== Press brake forming ===
Forming metal on a pressbrake

This is a form of bending used to produce long, thin sheet metal parts. The machine that bends the metal is called a press brake. The lower part of the press contains a V-shaped groove called the die. The upper part of the press contains a punch that presses the sheet metal down into the v-shaped die, causing it to bend. There are several techniques used, but the most common modern method is "air bending". Here, the die has a sharper angle than the required bend (typically 85 degrees for a 90 degree bend) and the upper tool is precisely controlled in its stroke to push the metal down the required amount to bend it through 90 degrees. Typically, a general purpose machine has an available bending force of around 25 tons per meter of length. The opening width of the lower die is typically 8 to 10 times the thickness of the metal to be bent (for example, 5 mm material could be bent in a 40 mm die). The inner radius of the bend formed in the metal is determined not by the radius of the upper tool, but by the lower die width. Typically, the inner radius is equal to 1/6 of the V-width used in the forming process.

The press usually has some sort of back gauge to position depth of the bend along the workpiece. The backgauge can be computer controlled to allow the operator to make a series of bends in a component to a high degree of accuracy. Simple machines control only the backstop, more advanced machines control the position and angle of the stop, its height and the position of the two reference pegs used to locate the material. The machine can also record the exact position and pressure required for each bending operation to allow the operator to achieve a perfect 90 degree bend across a variety of operations on the part.

=== Punching ===
Punching is performed by placing the sheet of metal stock between a punch and a die mounted in a press. The punch and die are made of hardened steel and are the same shape. The punch is sized to be a very close fit in the die. The press pushes the punch against and into the die with enough force to cut a hole in the stock. In some cases the punch and die "nest" together to create a depression in the stock. In progressive stamping, a coil of stock is fed into a long die/punch set with many stages. Multiple simple shaped holes may be produced in one stage, but complex holes are created in multiple stages. In the final stage, the part is punched free from the "web".

A typical CNC turret punch has a choice of up to 60 tools in a "turret" that can be rotated to bring any tool to the punching position. A simple shape (e.g. a square, circle, or hexagon) is cut directly from the sheet. A complex shape can be cut out by making many square or rounded cuts around the perimeter. A punch is less flexible than a laser for cutting compound shapes, but faster for repetitive shapes (for example, the grille of an air-conditioning unit). A CNC punch can achieve 600 strokes per minute.

A typical component (such as the side of a computer case) can be cut to high precision from a blank sheet in under 15 seconds by either a press or a laser CNC machine.

=== Roll forming ===
A continuous bending operation for producing open profiles or welded tubes with long lengths or in large quantities.

=== Rolling ===
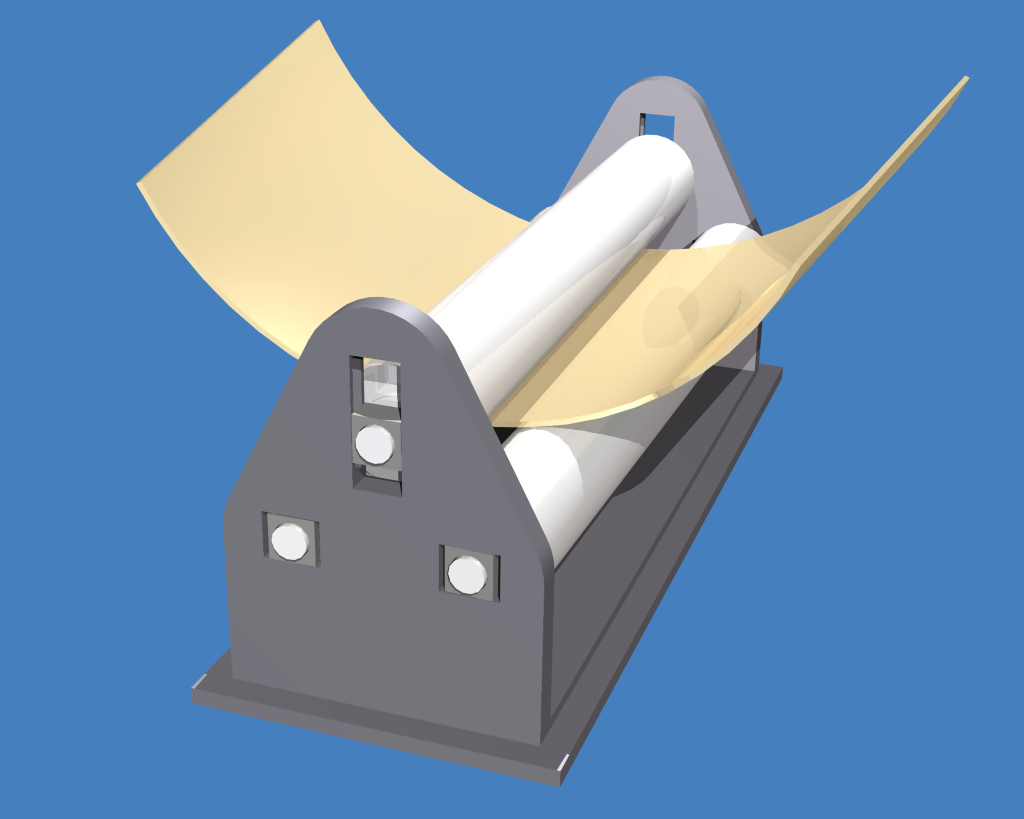
Bending sheet metal with rollers

Rolling is metal working or metal forming process. In this method, stock passes through one or more pair of rolls to reduce thickness. It is used to make thickness uniform. It is classified according to its temperature of rolling:

1. Hot rolling: in this temperature is above recrystallisation temperature.
2. Cold rolling: In this temperature is below recrystallisation temperature.
3. Warm rolling: In this temperature is used is in between hot rolling and cold rolling.

=== Spinning ===
Spinning is used to make tubular (axis-symmetric) parts by fixing a piece of sheet stock to a rotating form (mandrel). Rollers or rigid tools press the stock against the form, stretching it until the stock takes the shape of the form. Spinning is used to make rocket motor casings, missile nose cones, satellite dishes and metal kitchen funnels.

=== Stamping ===
Stamping includes a variety of operations such as punching, blanking, embossing, bending, flanging, and coining; simple or complex shapes can be formed at high production rates; tooling and equipment costs can be high, but labor costs are low.

Alternatively, the related techniques repoussé and chasing have low tooling and equipment costs, but high labor costs.

=== Water jet cutting ===
A water jet cutter, also known as a waterjet, is a tool capable of a controlled erosion into metal or other materials using a jet of water at high velocity and pressure, or a mixture of water and an abrasive substance.

=== Wheeling ===
The process of using an English wheel is called wheeling. It is basically a metal working or metal forming process. An English wheel is used by a craftsperson to form compound curves from a flat sheet of metal of aluminium or steel. It is costly, as highly skilled labour is required. It can produce different panels by the same method. A stamping press is used for high numbers in production.

== Sheet metal fabrication ==
The use of sheet metal, through a comprehensive cold working process, including bending, shearing, punching, laser cutting, water jet cutting, riveting, splicing, etc. to make the final product we want (such as computer chassis, washing machine shells, refrigerator door panels, etc.), we generally called sheet metal fabrication. The academic community currently has no uniform definition, but this process has a common feature of the process is that the material is generally a thin sheet, and will not change the thickness of most of the material of the part.

== Fasteners ==
Fasteners that are commonly used on sheet metal include: clecos, rivets, and sheet metal screws.

== See also ==
- Circle grid analysis
- Corrugated galvanised iron, also known as corrugated sheet metal
- Diamond plate
- Forming limit diagram
- Sheet metal worker
- Strip steel
- Temper mill
