= Circle grid analysis =

Circle grid analysis (CGA), also known as circle grid strain analysis, is a method of measuring the strain levels of sheet metal after a part is formed by stamping or drawing. The name itself is a fairly accurate description of the process.

Literally, a grid of circles of known diameter is etched to the surface of the sheet metal to be formed. After the part is formed, the circles have been stretched into ellipses. By measuring the longest part of the ellipse (called the “major strain”) and the shortest part of the ellipse (called the “minor strain”), it is possible to determine how close any stamped part is to splitting or fracturing.

== Application ==
The goal of using circle grid strain analysis is to predict potential problems before they become problems. Once you have a forming problem, chances are circle grid analysis won’t be able to help you, unless it’s intermittent enough to form a “good” part from time to time.

== See also ==
- Forming limit diagram
- Crankshaft deep rolling
