= Hydroforming =

Method of shaping metal through pressurized water

A plate being shaped through hydroforming

Hydroforming is a specialized type of die forming that uses a high pressure hydraulic fluid to press room temperature working material into a die. It is a means of shaping ductile metals such as aluminium, brass, low alloy steel, and stainless steel into lightweight, structurally stiff and strong pieces. One of the largest applications of cost-effective hydroforming is the automotive industry, which makes use of the complex shapes made possible by hydroforming to produce stronger, lighter, and more rigid unibody structures for vehicles. This technique is particularly popular with the high-end sports car industry and is also frequently employed in the shaping of aluminium tubes for bicycle frames.

To hydroform aluminium into a vehicle's frame rail, a hollow tube of aluminium is placed inside a negative mold that has the shape of the desired result. High pressure hydraulic pumps then inject fluid at very high pressure inside the aluminium tube which causes it to expand until it matches the mold. The hydroformed aluminium is then removed from the mold. Hydroforming allows complex shapes with concavities to be formed, which would be difficult or impossible with standard solid die stamping. Hydroformed parts can often be made with a higher stiffness-to-weight ratio and at a lower per unit cost than traditional stamped or stamped and welded parts. Virtually all metals capable of cold forming can be hydroformed, including aluminium, brass, carbon and stainless steel, copper, and high strength alloys.

Electrohydraulic forming uses electrodes to vaporize the fluid explosively in an arc to deform the working material.

== Main process variants ==
=== Sheet hydroforming ===
This process is based on the 1950s patent for hydramolding by Fred Leuthesser, Jr. and John Fox of the Schaible Company of Cincinnati, Ohio in the United States. It was originally used in producing kitchen spouts. This was done because in addition to the strengthening of the metal, hydromolding also produced less "grainy" parts, allowing for easier metal finishing. In sheet hydroforming there are bladder forming (where there is a bladder that contains the liquid; no liquid contacts the sheet) and hydroforming where the fluid contacts the sheet (no bladder). Bladder forming is sometimes called flexforming. Flexforming is mostly used for low volume productions, as in the aerospace field. Forming with the fluid in direct contact with the part can be done either with a male solid punch (this version is sometimes called hydro-mechanical deep drawing) or with a female solid die. In hydro-mechanical deep drawing, a work piece is placed on a draw ring (blank holder) over a male punch then a hydraulic chamber surrounds the work piece and a relatively low initial pressure seats the work piece against the punch. The punch then is raised into the hydraulic chamber and pressure is increased to as high as 100 MPa (15000 psi) which forms the part around the punch. Then the pressure is released and punch retracted, hydraulic chamber lifted, and the process is complete.

Among these techniques hydraulic bulge testing allows for an increased work hardening of sheet material by distinctive stretching operations and provides better shape accuracy for complex parts. Hence, by selecting proper material and the forming parameters for hydraulic sheet bulging study one can determine Forming Limit Curves (FLCs).

Significance

- Hydraulic bulge testing is more appropriate for sheet metal forming operations as deformation mode is bi-axial rather than uniaxial. Also it provides flow curves for the materials with extended range of plastic strain levels up to 70% before bursting occurs.
- It is helpful to generate the FLCs which will be reliable sense of reference input to the explicit solver like LS-DYNA. These obtained FLCs are used as load curve input for such solvers for analysis.
- FLCs also serve the best for identifying the exact zone for forming operations without getting affected with localized necking and other possible defects while forming.
- Hydraulic bulge testing would be helpful to calculate the Strain hardening coefficient- "n" (i.e. Work hardening coefficient) of the material, to determine the ability of the material to be formed.
- A simple and versatile approach.
- A controlled pressure distribution over part surface during forming can be used to “control” the sheet thickness and postpone localized necking.
- The use of only single form surface tooling, which saves time and expense in the manufacture of tooling. Absence of rigid tool contact on one surface also reduces surface friction and thus surface defects, resulting in a good surface finish.

==== Alternative names, other variants and similar processes ====
- Hydromec (Hydromechanical deep drawing)
- Aquadraw
- Bulge forming
- Explosive forming
  - For large parts, explosive hydroforming can generate the forming pressure by simply exploding a charge above the part (complete with evacuated mold) which is immersed in a pool of water. The tooling can be much cheaper than what would be required for any press-type process. The hydroforming-into-a-mold process also works using only a shock wave in air as the pressuring medium. Particularly when the explosives are close to the workpiece, inertia effects make the result more complicated than forming by hydrostatic pressure alone.
- Rubber pad forming

=== Tube hydroforming ===
In tube hydroforming there are two major practices: high pressure and low pressure. With the high pressure process the tube is fully enclosed in a die prior to pressurization of the tube. In low pressure the tube is slightly pressurized to a fixed volume during the closing of the die (this used to be called the Variform process). Historically, the process was patented in the '50s, but it was industrially spread in the 1970s for the production of large T-shaped joints for the oil and gas industry. Today it is mostly used in the automotive sector, where many industrial applications can be found. With the rise of the electric bicycle it is now a method of choice for e-bicycle manufacturers. Especially down tubes and top tubes are favorably made with hydroforming in order to fit the battery for the electric bicycle. Newest applications in the bicycle industry are now hydroformed handlebars to improve aero dynamics and ergonomics. In tube hydroforming pressure is applied to the inside of a tube that is held by dies with the desired cross sections and forms. When the dies are closed, the tube ends are sealed by axial punches and the tube is filled with hydraulic fluid. The internal pressure can go up to a few thousand bars and it causes the tube to calibrate against the dies. The fluid is injected into the tube through one of the two axial punches. Axial punches are movable and their action is required to provide axial compression and to feed material towards the center of the bulging tube. Transverse counterpunches may also be incorporated in the forming die in order to form protrusions with small diameter/length ratio. Transverse counter punches may also be used to punch holes in the work piece at the end of the forming process.

Designing the process has in the past been a challenging task, since initial analytical modeling is possible only for limited cases. Advances in FEA and FEM in recent years has enabled hydroform processes to be more widely engineered for varieties of parts and materials. Often FEM simulations must be performed in order to find a feasible process solution and to define the correct loading curves: pressure vs. time and axial feed vs. time. In the case of more complex tube hydroformed parts the tube must be pre-bent prior to loading into the hydroforming die. Bending is done sequentially along the length of the tube, with the tube being bent around bending discs (or dies) as the tube length is fed in. Bending can be done with or without mandrels. This additional complexity of process further increases the reliance on FEM for designing and evaluating manufacturing processes. The feasibility of a hydroforming process must take into consideration the initial tube material properties and its potential for variation, along with the bending process, hydraulic pressure throughout the forming process, in inclusion of axial feed or not, in order to predict metal formability.

Process sequence in tube hydroforming of a t-shape with counterpunch

== Typical tools ==
Tools and punches can be interchanged for different part requirements. One advantage of hydroforming is the savings on tools. For sheet metal only a draw ring and punch (metalworking) or male die is required. Depending on the part being formed, the punch can be made from epoxy, rather than metal. The bladder of the hydroform itself acts as the female die eliminating the need to fabricate it. This allows for changes in material thickness to be made with usually no necessary changes to the tool. However, dies must be highly polished and in tube hydroforming a two-piece die is required to allow opening and closing.

== Geometry produced ==
Another advantage of hydroforming is that complex shapes can be made in one step. In sheet hydroforming with the bladder acting as the male die almost limitless geometries can be produced. However, the process is limited by the very high closing force required in order to seal the dies, especially for large panels and thick hard materials. Small concave corner radii are difficult to be completely calibrated, i.e. filled, because too large a pressure would be required. in fact, the die closing force can be very high, both in tube and sheet hydroforming and may easily overcome the maximum tonnage of the forming press. In order to keep the die closing force under prescribed limits, the maximum internal fluid pressure must be limited. This reduces the calibration abilities of the process, i.e. it reduces the possibility of forming parts with small concave radii. Limits of the sheet hydroforming process are due to risks of excessive thinning, fracture, wrinkling and are strictly related to the material formability and to a proper selection of process parameters (e.g. hydraulic pressure vs. time curve). Tube hydroforming can produce many geometric options as well, reducing the need for tube welding operations. Similar limitations and risks can be listed as in sheet hydroforming; however, the maximum closing force is seldom a limiting factor in tube hydroforming.

== Tolerances and surface finish ==
Hydroforming is capable of producing parts within tight tolerances including aircraft tolerances where a common tolerance for sheet metal parts is within 0.76 mm (1/32th of an inch). Metal hydroforming also allows for a smoother finish as draw marks produced by the traditional method of pressing a male and female die together are eliminated.

While springback has long been a topic of discussion for sheet metal forming operations it has been far less of a topic of research for tube hydroforming. This may in part be a result of the relatively low levels of springback naturally occurring when deforming the tubes into their closed section geometries. Tube Hydroformed sections by the nature of their closed sections are very rigid and do not display high degrees of elastic deformation under load. For this reason it is likely that negative residual stress induced during tube hydroforming might be insufficient to deform the part elastically after the completion of forming. However, as more and more tubular parts are being manufactured using high strength steel and advanced high strength steel parts, springback must be accounted for in the design and manufacture of closed section tube hydroformed parts.

== Examples ==
Notable examples include:

=== Sheet Hydro Forming ===
- Satellite antennas up to 6 meters in diameter, such as those used in the Allen Telescope Array.
- Lighting fixture housing and reflector

=== Tube Hydro Forming ===
- Many motor vehicles have components manufactured using hydroformed tubing, with the first mass-produced automotive component being the instrument panel support beam for the 1990 Chrysler Minivan.
  - The technique is widely used in the manufacture of engine cradles. The first mass-produced one was for the Ford Contour and Mystique in 1994. Others from a long list include the Pontiac Aztek, the Honda Accord and the perimeter frame around the Harley Davidson V-Rod motorcycle's engine.
  - Other significant automotive applications for hydroforming include suspension components, and radiator supports.
  - Various vehicle frame components, the earliest mass-produced one being the 1997 Chevrolet Corvette. A selection from many examples are the current versions of the three major United States pickup trucks—the Ford F-150, Chevrolet Silverado, and Ram—which all have hydroformed frame rails, 2006 Pontiac Solstice and the steel frame inside the John Deere HPX Gator Utility Vehicle.
- The process has recently become popular for the manufacture of aluminium wheelchair frames and wheelchair hand rims, making wheelchair more rigid and lightweight and hand rims more ergonomic.
- The process has become popular for the manufacture of aluminium bicycle frames. The earliest commercially manufactured one being that of the Giant Manufacturing Revive bicycle first marketed in 2003.
- The brass tube of Yamaha saxophones.

== See also ==
- Blow molding, for thermoplastics
