= Stamping press =

Metalworking machine tool

Power press with a fixed barrier guard

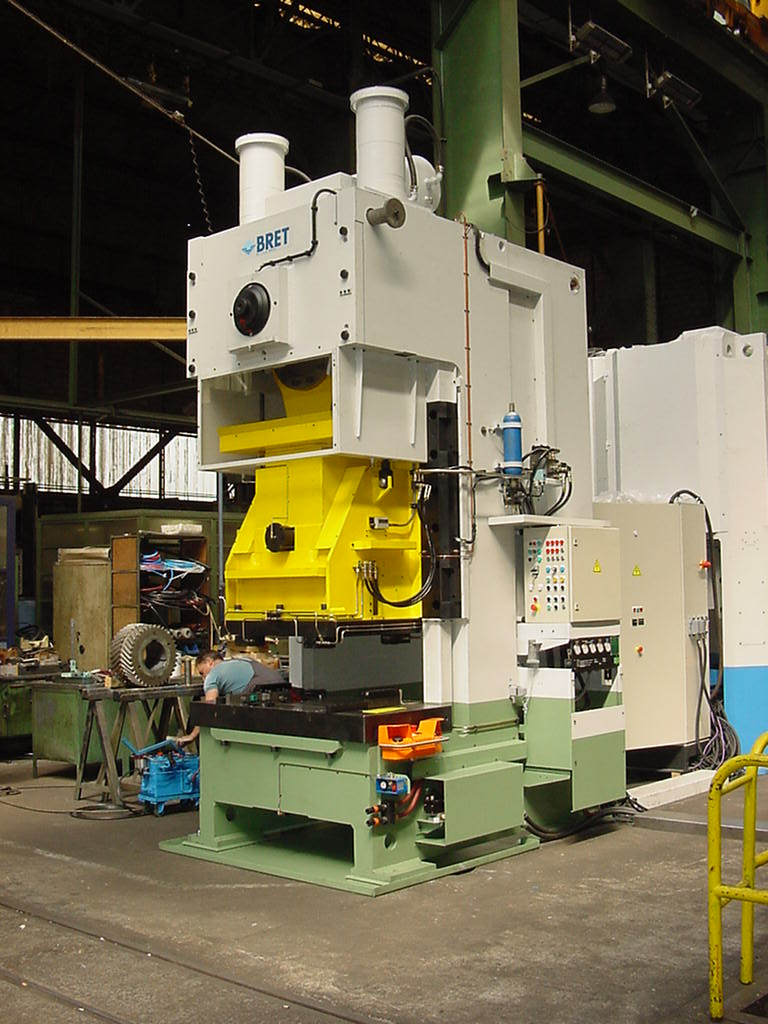
Mechanical press

A stamping press is a metalworking machine tool used to shape or cut metal by deforming it with a die. A stamping press uses precision-made male and female dies to shape the final product. It is a modern-day counterpart to the hammer and anvil.

== Components ==
A press has a bolster plate, and a ram. Presses come in various types of frame configurations, C-Frame where the front & left and right sides are open, straight-side, or H-Frame for stronger higher tonnage applications. It is very important to size the press and tonnage based on the type of applications, blanking, forming, progressive, or transfer. Strong consideration should be given to avoiding off-center load conditions to prevent premature wear to the press.

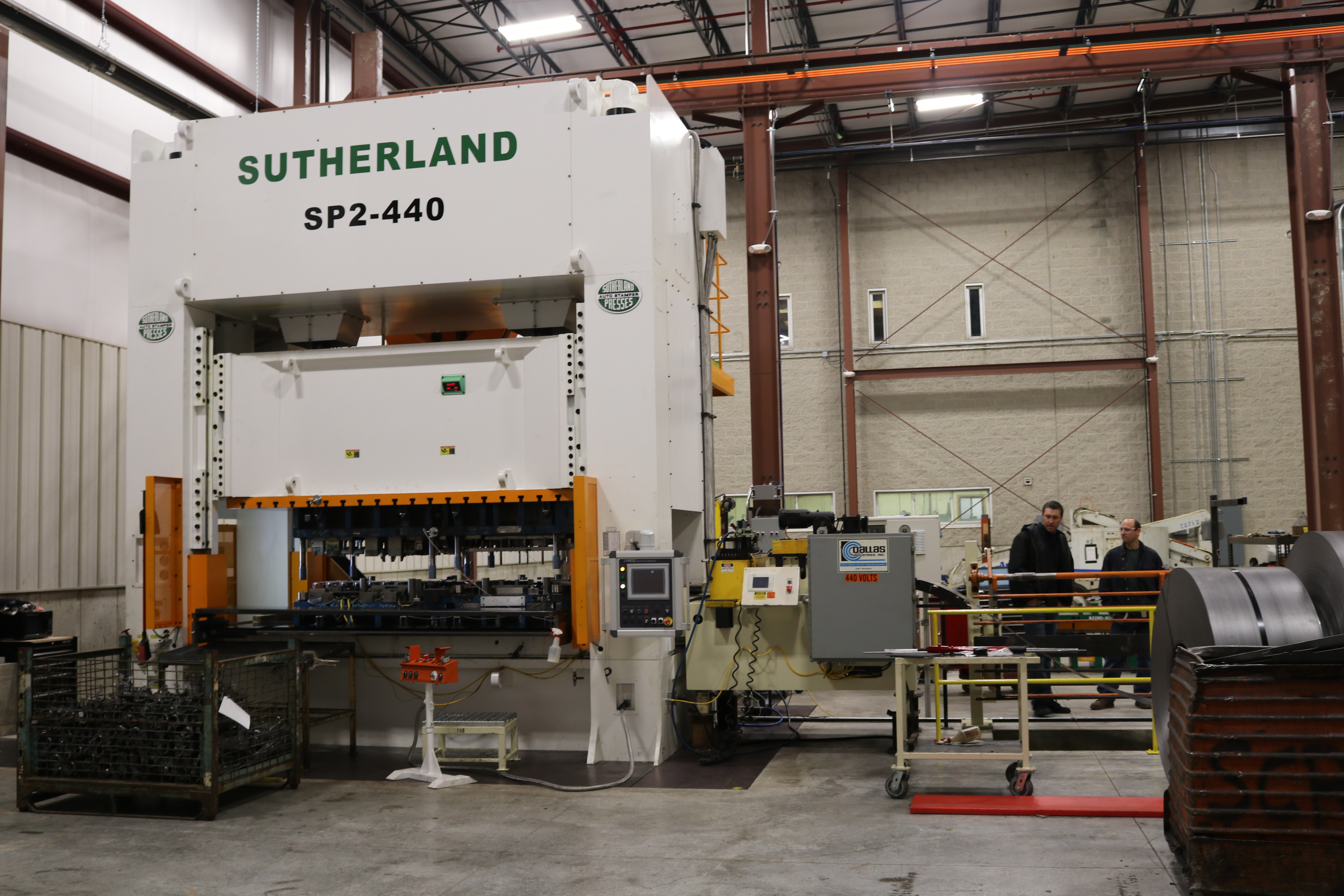
A 440 ton progressive die stamping press

=== Bolster Plate ===
The bolster plate is mounted on top of the press bed and is a large block of metal upon which the bottom portion of a die is clamped; the bolster plate is stationary. Large presses (like the ones used in the automotive industry) may be equipped with die cushions integrated in the bolster plate to apply blank holder or counter draw forces. This is necessary when a single acting press is used for deep drawing. The ram / slide is the moving or reciprocating member that the upper die is mounted to. Ram or Slide guidance is a critical element to assure long die life between die maintenance. Different types of slide guides are available, 4 point V-Gibs or 6 point square gibs on smaller presses and 8 point full length slide guides on larger straight side frame presses. The dies and material are fed into the press between the bolster and slide. Good press designs must account for plastic deformation, otherwise known as deflection when frame design and loads are considered.

=== Ram / Slide ===
The vertical motion of the slide acts like a hammer to an anvil. The most common Mechanical Presses use an eccentric drive to move the press's ram slide, length of stroke or slide travel depends on the crankshaft or eccentric, whereas hydraulic cylinders are used in hydraulic presses. The nature of drive system determines the force progression during the ram's stroke. Mechanical presses have a full tonnage rating point above BDC / Bottom Dead Center, normal full tonnage rating points are .187", .25" & .5". Hence a mechanical press has a tonnage curve and should be operated within the press capacity limits. Link Motion mechanical is yet another option, this provides a slide slow down near BDC / bottom dead center for soft touch tooling. This link feature can improve die life and reduce reverse-snap thru tonnage for blanking operations.

On the contrary, Hydraulic Presses do not have a tonnage curve and can produce full tonnage at any point in the stroke. The trade-off is speed, a mechanical press is much faster when compared to hydraulic. On the other hand, Hydraulic Presses are much more practical for deep forming or drawing or parts or when dwell time at the bottom is desired.

Another classification is single-acting presses versus double- (seldom triple) acting presses. Single-acting presses have one single ram. Double-acting presses have a subdivided ram, to manage, for example, blank holding (to avoid wrinkles) with one ram segment and the forming operation with the second ram segment.

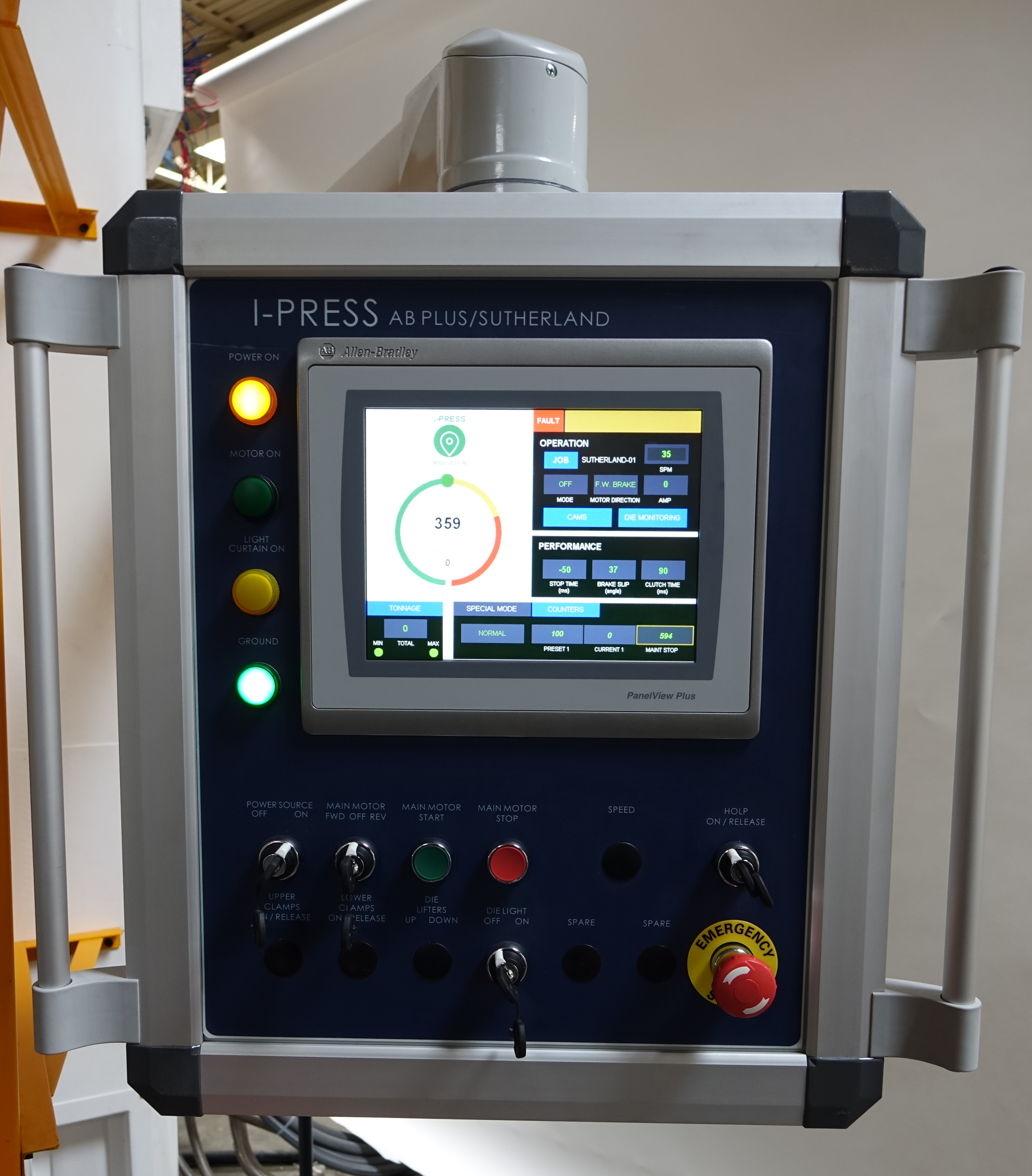
I-PRESS AB PLUS full featured safe press & automation controller

=== Other Components & Controls ===
Typically, presses are electronically linked (with a programmable logic controller) to an automatic feeder which feeds metal raw material through the die. The raw material is fed into the automatic feeder after it has been unrolled from a coil and put through a straightener. A tonnage monitor may be provided to observe the amount of force used for each stroke.
