= Spring back =

Spring back may refer to:

- Springback compensation, a method to compensate the springback effect of metal while bending
- Bending, a forming process
- Bending (metalworking), a forming process, article specialized for metalworking
