= Bending machine =

Bending machine may refer to:

- Bending machine (manufacturing), a forming machine tool
- Brake (sheet metal bending), a metalworking machine that allows the bending of sheet metal
