= Diesel fuel tanks in trucks =

Diesel fuel tanks for the trucking industry are generally built for the same applications as those for automotive uses but with larger capacity.

== Regulations ==
The manufacture of diesel fuel tanks is strictly governed by safety regulations. Fuel tanks of a capacity greater than 25 US gallons must adhere to specifications for spillage, leakage, mounting, impact survivability, weld requirements, venting and a host of other stipulations. The regulations require side-mounted fuel tanks to survive a 30-foot drop test, while non-side-mounted fuel tanks must survive a 10-foot drop test. Clear specifications are given as to what constitutes a successful drop test and how to conduct the test. The regulations also require, among other things, that fuel tanks pass a leakage test and a flame test. The procedures for conducting the tests are detailed in the regulations.

== Design ==
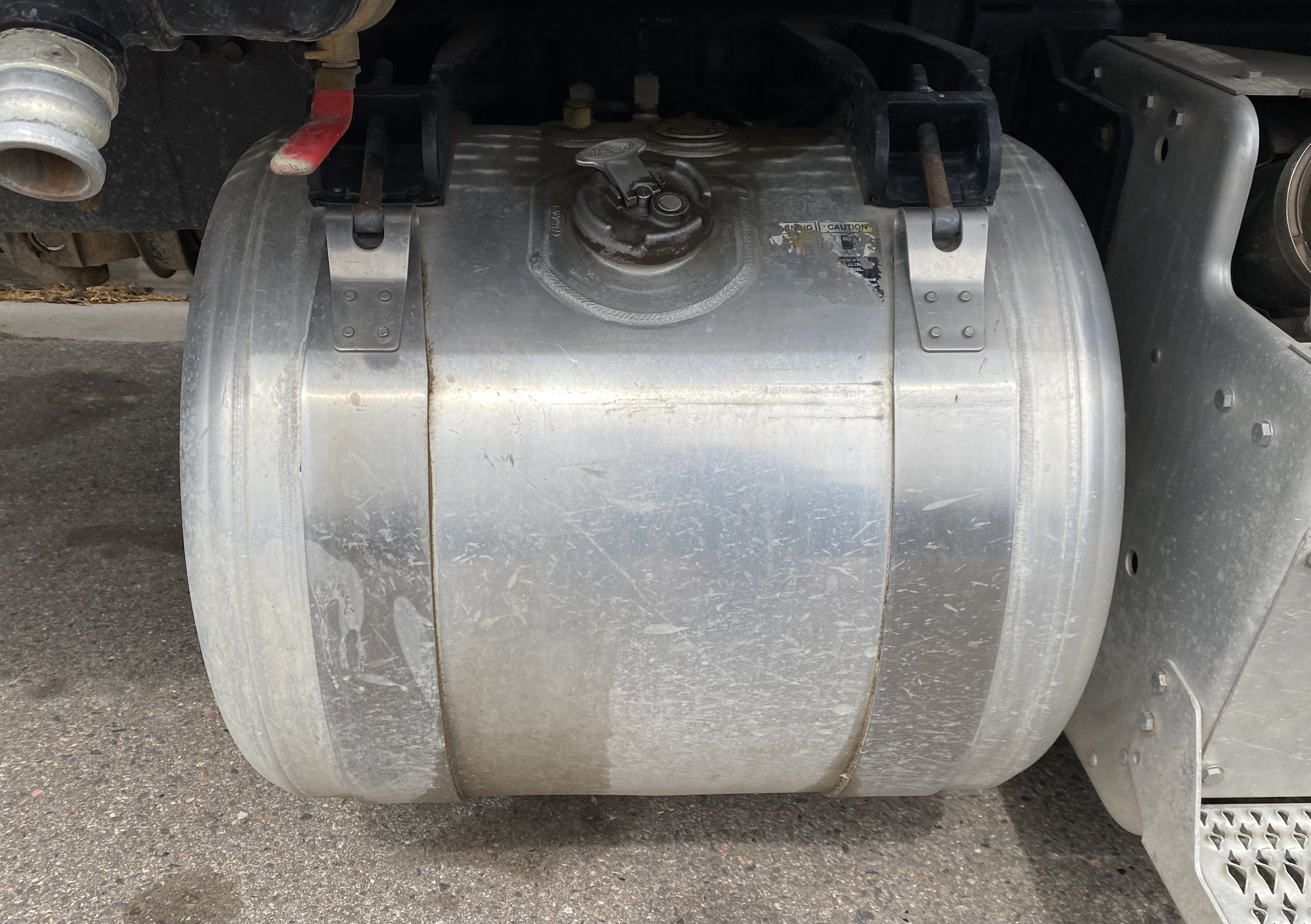
A cylindrical Peterbilt diesel fuel tank

Important considerations in designing a diesel fuel tank are determining placement, choosing the shape and calculating the required volume. Side mounting is the most common placement of diesel tanks for trucks. This is typically accomplished with the use of brackets, straps or a combination of both for the purpose of attaching the fuel tank to the truck frame.

The choice of shape is generally influenced by the need for maximum fuel capacity and the desire for a stylish look. The most common diesel tank designs are cylindrical, rectangular and D-Style tanks. Cylindrical designs are often selected for their visual appeal while the rectangular tank is most often employed to maximize fuel volume for a given space.

The D-Tank, as its name implies, is actually a hybrid of the cylindrical and rectangular designs. It offers the curved visual appeal of a cylindrical tank with significantly more fuel volume. Replacing a cylindrical fuel tank with a D-Tank can result in 46% additional fuel capacity. When calculating volume requirements, one would begin by assessing the available space. Once length, width and height restrictions have been ascertained, the easiest method of determining volume is with the use of a truck tank volume calculator. Although basic mathematics can be applied to calculate the volume of a cylinder, calculating that of a rectangular tank is more complex due to the rounded corners. Designers must take into consideration the loss of volume due to the radius of rounded corners.

== Construction ==
Material selection is one of the key considerations in producing fuel tanks. The three most common materials used in the manufacture of fuel tanks are aluminum, steel, and stainless steel. Regardless of the choice of material, the quality of the selection must be such as to allow that material to be malleable enough to be bent, rolled and stamped into formation.

Aluminum alloy 5052 H32 is a popular choice for fuel tanks as it contains adequate magnesium content to allow the material to be pliable enough to meet the needs of the manufacturing process. The majority of diesel tanks manufactured today are made of steel; however truck operators may elect to choose aluminum fuel tanks when replacing older tanks on their vehicles. Aluminum offers advantages of lighter weight and resistance to corrosion.

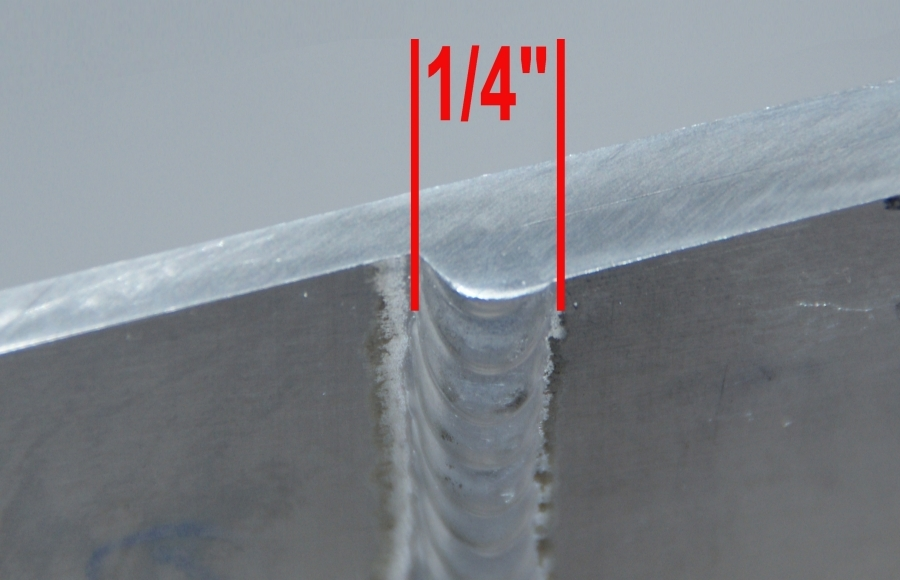
Proper weld is 1/4 inch wide

The selection of steel and stainless steel should be that of prime grade material. An important consideration in manufacturing is choosing material suitable for stamping and bending. The material must be ductile enough to be bent and formed yet thick enough to provide strength and to accept a weld. This is especially true for tanks of a design that require sharp bends.

The pattern for a fuel tank is generally cut using automated programmable machinery such as laser cutters, high definition plasma cutters or water jet cutters. These tools provide accuracy and process repeatability.

Once cut, the manufacturer removes the dross left behind from the cutting process. The holes required for ports, filler tubes, vents etc. are generally created with the use of a punch press.

At this stage in the process all the metal parts that make up the fuel tank are cut to shape, stamped with holes and are flat according to a pattern, ready to be shaped three-dimensionally.

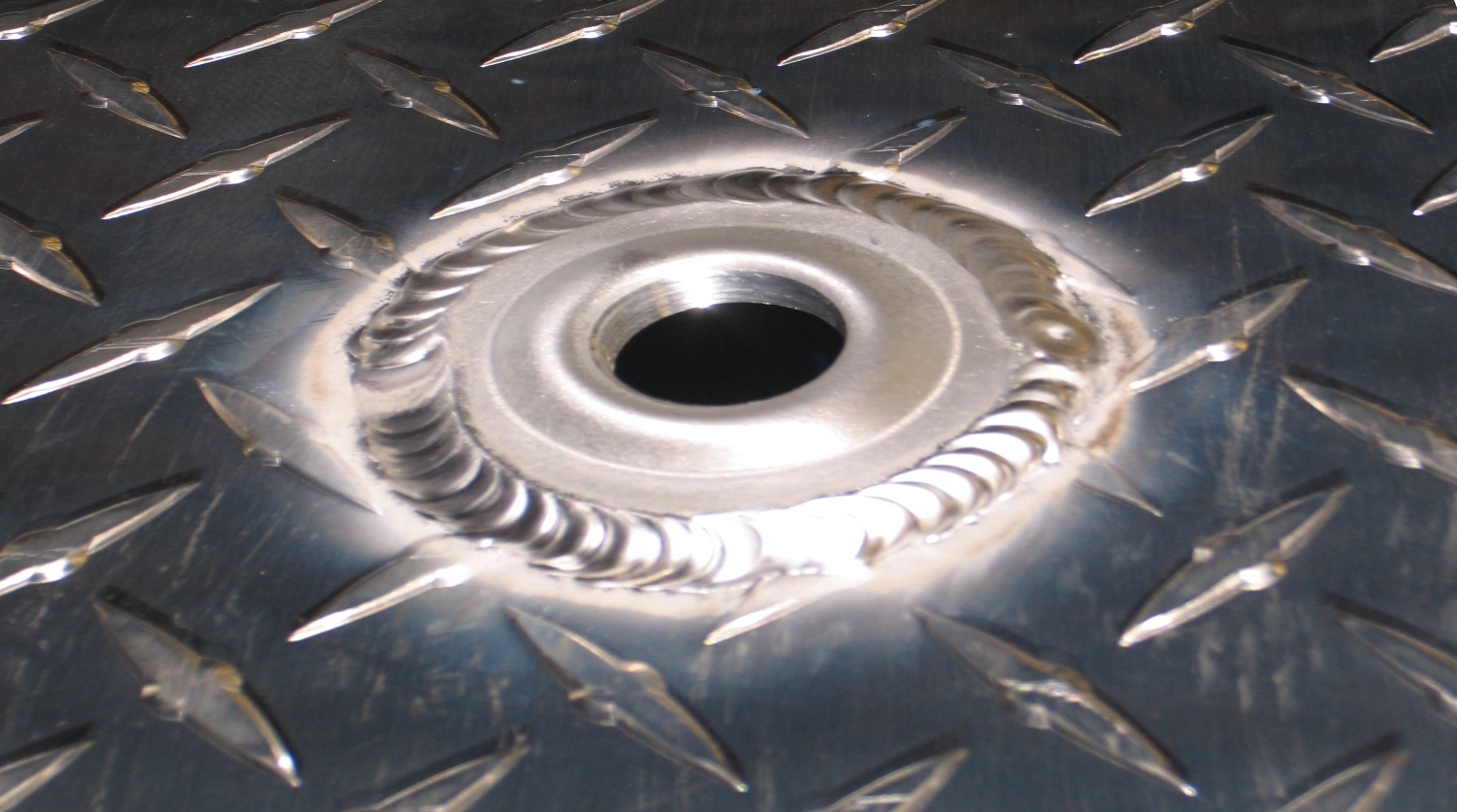
TIG weld is identifiable by its "stacked dime" appearance

Next, the heads which are often referred to as the "end caps" are formed in a die using a stamping press. This applies to all fuel tanks regardless of shape – D-Tanks, cylindrical or rectangular. The "body" of the diesel tank is then formed to fit around the heads. Cylindrical tanks are rolled in a roll forming machine while non-cylindrical tanks are bent on a press brake.

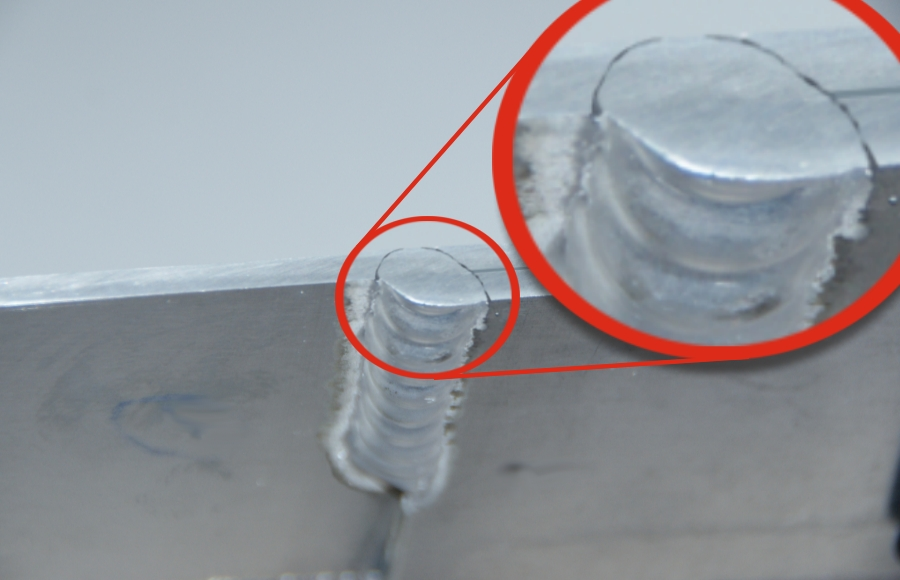
Enlargement of a proper weld cross section

At this point in the manufacturing process the parts have been cut, shaped and ready for welding. Although each step in the process is important, good welds are of particular significance because they hold the pieces together and prevent leaks when done correctly. The weld must be 1/4 inch wide and have deep penetration into the metal. A proper weld is continuous, convex in shape and exhibits no porosity.

The underlying objective in manufacturing a diesel tank is to build it in such a way as to hold fuel for the life of the tank from the day it is installed. This requires a quality assurance test to identify the possibility of leaks. A common procedure in the industry is to perform a pressure test on the tank. All holes are temporarily plugged and the fuel tank is pressurized with air. A gauge is used to monitor the air pressure. A drop in pressure reveals a leak in the tank.

Many manufacturers have adopted statistical process control (SPC) as a method of measuring the integrity of fuel tanks. Typically, using SPC, the manufacturer will test samples from a production lot and draw conclusions from the statistical data. However some manufacturers strive for a zero-failure rate and test each tank as part of their quality program.

Following a successful leak test the fuel tank is ready for cleaning with a "metal-prep" solution. This may be done by hand or by employing a multi-stage submersion method. The purpose is to clean away the oils and particles left behind from the manufacturing process to prepare the surface for painting. This applies primarily for steel tanks, but some aluminum tanks may also be painted. Stainless steel tanks are rarely painted due to their inherent corrosion resistant properties.

The final step in the manufacturing process is to apply the coatings. All openings are plugged to prevent paint or other contaminants from entering the fuel tank. Some of the most common coatings include rust resistant enamel, epoxy paint or powder coating to protect against environmental elements. Once the coating has cured, the tank is ready to be installed on the truck.

== See also ==
- Fuel leak
