= Plate rolling machine =

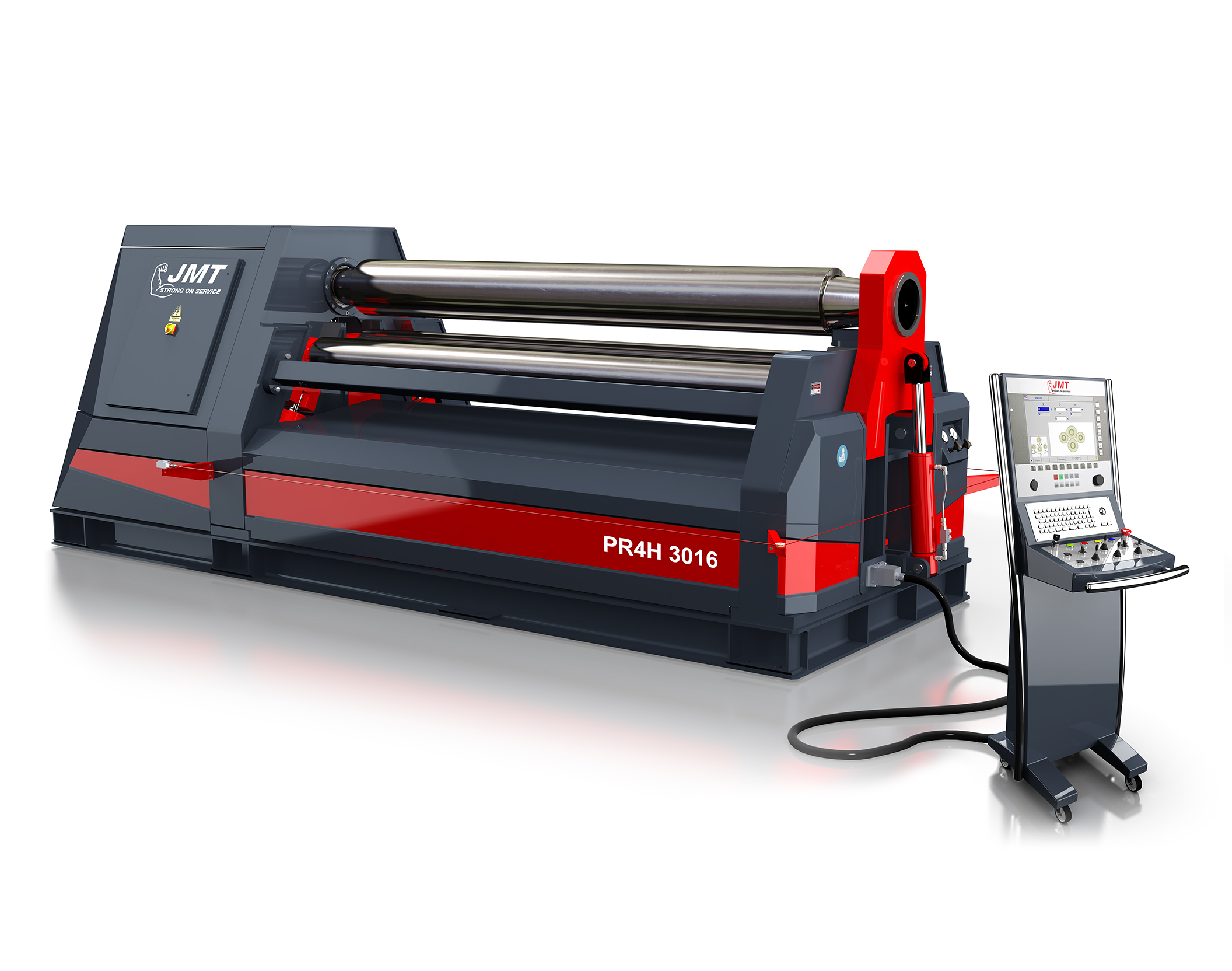
CNC plate roll machine

A plate rolling machine is a machine that will roll different kinds of sheet metal into a round or conical shape. It can be also called a “roll bending machine”, “plate bending machine” or “rolling machine”.

There are different kinds of technology to roll the metal plate:

- Four-roller machines have a top roll, the pinching roll, and two side rolls.

The flat metal plate is placed in the machine on either side and "pre-bent" on the same side. The side rolls do the work of bending. The pinching roll holds the plate.

- Three-roller machines (variable pitch a.k.a. variable geometry) have one pressing top roll and two pressing side rolls.

The three-roll variable pitch works by having all three rolls able to move and tilt. The top roll moves in the vertical plane and the side rolls move on the horizontal plane. When rolling, the top roll presses the metal plate between the two side rolls. The advantage of having the variable three roll is the ability to roll many thicknesses and diameters of cylinders.

For example; The side-rolls are what produce the mechanical advantage. With the side rolls all the way open, one has the maximum mechanical advantage. With the side rolls all the way in, you have the least mechanical advantage. So, a machine has the capability of rolling 2-inch-thick material with the maximum mechanical advantage, but a job is only 1/2 inch thick. Reduce the mechanical advantage and one has a machine that can roll from 1/2 to 2 inches thick.

Plate rollers can be powered and controlled in multiple ways. Older plate mills are driven by electric motors and newer ones are directed by programs that are loaded into the CNC controller. When thinking about plate roll acquisition, industrial machinery companies like Provetco Technology will ask about the working length of the roller, the maximum thickness of the material, top roll diameter size as well as the minimum thickness of the material. Furthermore, the material yield is another critical component to disclose to machinery companies when looking for a plate roller.
