= Brazier effect =

The Brazier effect was first discovered in 1927 by Brazier. He showed that when an initially straight tube was bent uniformly, the longitudinal tension and compression which resist the applied bending moment also tend to flatten or ovalise the cross-section. As the curvature increases, the flexural stiffness decreases. Brazier showed that under steadily increasing curvature the bending moment reaches a maximum value. After the bending moment reaches its maximum value, the structure becomes unstable, and so the object suddenly forms a "kink".

From Brazier’s analysis it follows that the crushing pressure increases with the square of the curvature of the section, and thus with the square of the bending moment.

== See also ==
- Bending
