= Springback compensation =

Machining technique

Spring back compensation is used in metal forming to ensure that the final shape assumed by a piece of metal after being removed from a forming tool is the shape desired. Typically, when metal is being formed at room temperature, it will undergo both plastic and elastic deformation. After the metal workpiece is removed from the tool or deformation implement, the elastic deformation will be released and only the plastic deformation will remain; thus, the workpiece will "spring back" to a position between its original position and the position into which it was formed. Usually, spring back compensation is realized by over-bending the material by an amount corresponding to the magnitude of the spring back.

When bending metal, spring back compensation is done by pushing the workpiece further into the die. For other sheet metal forming operations like drawing, it entails deforming the sheet metal past the planned shape of the part so that when the part's elastic deformation is released, the plastic deformation in that part delivers the desired shape of the part. In the case of complex tools, spring back must be considered in the engineering and construction phases. Complex software simulations are often used, but frequently this is not enough to deliver the desired results. In such cases practical experiments are done, using trial-and-error and experience to correct the process. However, the results of the process are only stable if all influencing factors are the same. These include such things as yield strength, chemical composition, aging processes, and structure of the workpiece; tool wear; and temperature and deformation rate during the forming process.

Spring back assessment of final formed products is a difficult problem and is affected by the complexity of the formed shape. The NUMISHEET 93 conference benchmark problem involves the draw bending of a U-channel using three measured parameters. Parameter-less approaches have been proposed for more complex geometries but they need validation.

Parametric finite element analysis can be used for the creation of Reduced Order Models based on Artificial Intelligence (ROM-AI) for the prediction of springback.

== Practical example: electronic bending tools with spring-back compensation ==
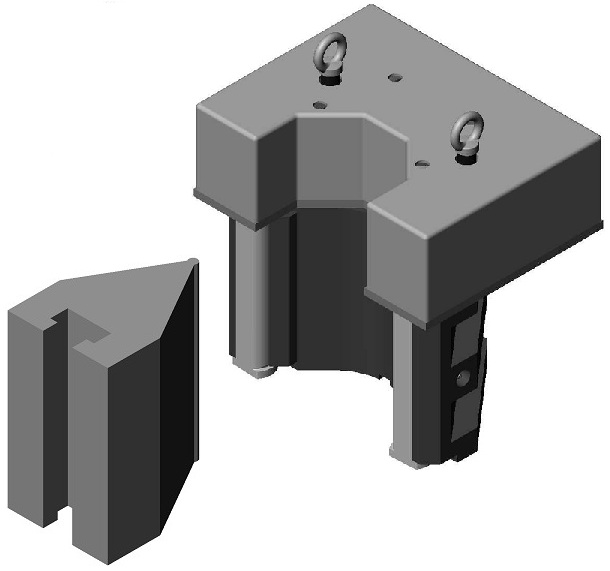
Electronic bending tool with integrated angle measurement and spring-back compensation

Manufacturing of electrical assemblies produces components that are flat, using copper and aluminum. The mechanical properties of copper and aluminum are very different and require different programmable inputs in order to achieve the same dimensional characteristics.

Bending technology for flat material which measures each bend angle and provides spring back compensation is required. This gives the bend angle of flat materials true accuracy. This is attained by using bending prisms with electronic angular measurement technology. While bending two flat bolds supporting the material turn around. The bolds are directly connected to the angular sensors. A computer or rather the machine control then calculates the required final stroke. The spring back of every bend is compensated regardless of material type.

If the measuring accuracy is 0.1º, a high angle accuracy of +/- 0.2º is achieved instantly with the first workpiece without any rework. Because no adjustments are required, material waste amounts and setup times drop considerably. Even inconsistencies within a single piece of material are automatically adjusted.

== See also ==
- Bending
- Bending (metalworking)
- Bending machine (manufacturing)
- Numerical control
