= Hemming and seaming =

Metalworking Process

hemming process

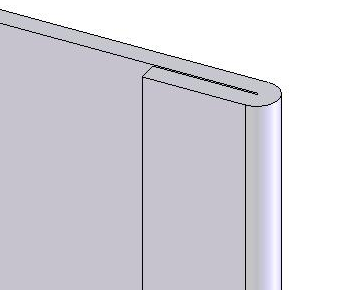
A closed hem

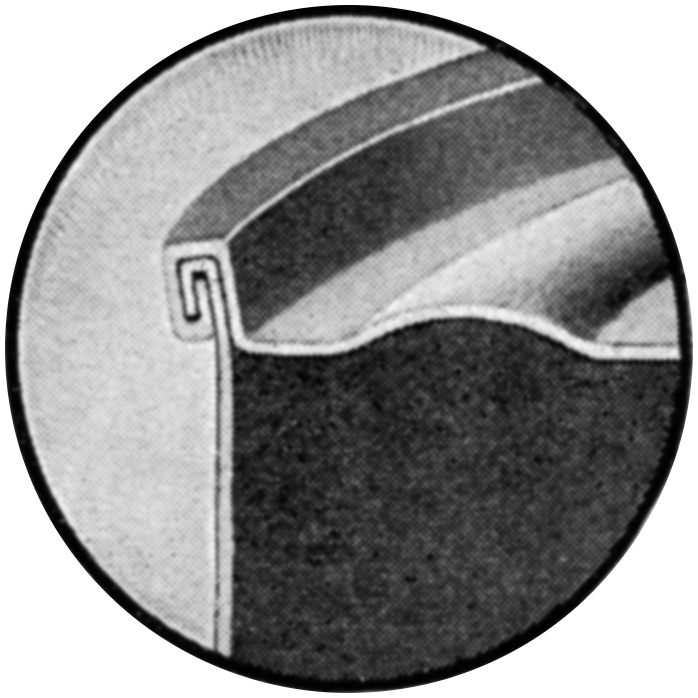
A seam

Hemming and seaming are two similar metalworking processes in which a sheet metal edge is rolled over onto itself. Hemming is the process in which the edge is rolled flush to itself, while a seam joins the edges of two materials.

Hems are commonly used to reinforce an edge, hide burrs and rough edges, and improve appearance.

Seams are commonly used in the food industry on canned goods, on amusement park cars, in metal roofing (with a roof seamer), and in the automotive industry.

== Process ==
The process for both hemming and seaming are the same, except that the tonnage (amount of force exerted) requirement is greater for seaming. The process starts by bending the edge to an acute angle. A flattening die is then used to flatten the hem.

== Types ==
There are two types of hemmed edges: closed hems and open hems. Closed hems are completely flush while open hems have an air pocket in the bend. The major difference is that the tonnage required for a closed hem is much greater than that for an open hem.

Tons per meter requirement for hemming cold-rolled steel and stainless steel
Material thickness [mm]	Open hem	Closed hem
0.6	9	23
0.8	12	32
1.0	15	40
1.2	17	50
1.6	24	63
2.0	30	80
2.6	55	90
3.2	70	100
4.5	105	200

== See also ==
- Can seamer
- Automotive hemming
