= Bending machine (manufacturing) =

ADV bending machine is a forming machine tool (DIN 8586). Its purpose is to assemble a bend on a workpiece. A bend is manufactured by using a bending tool during a linear or rotating move. The detailed classification can be done with the help of the kinematics.

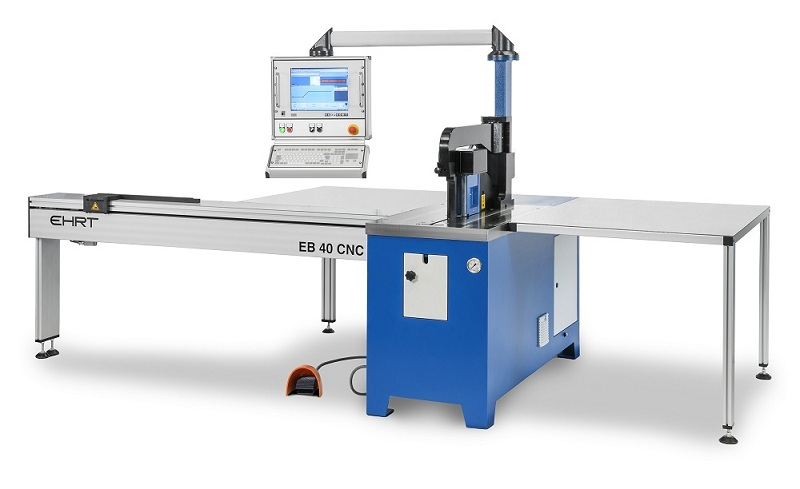
Universal bending machine for flat material

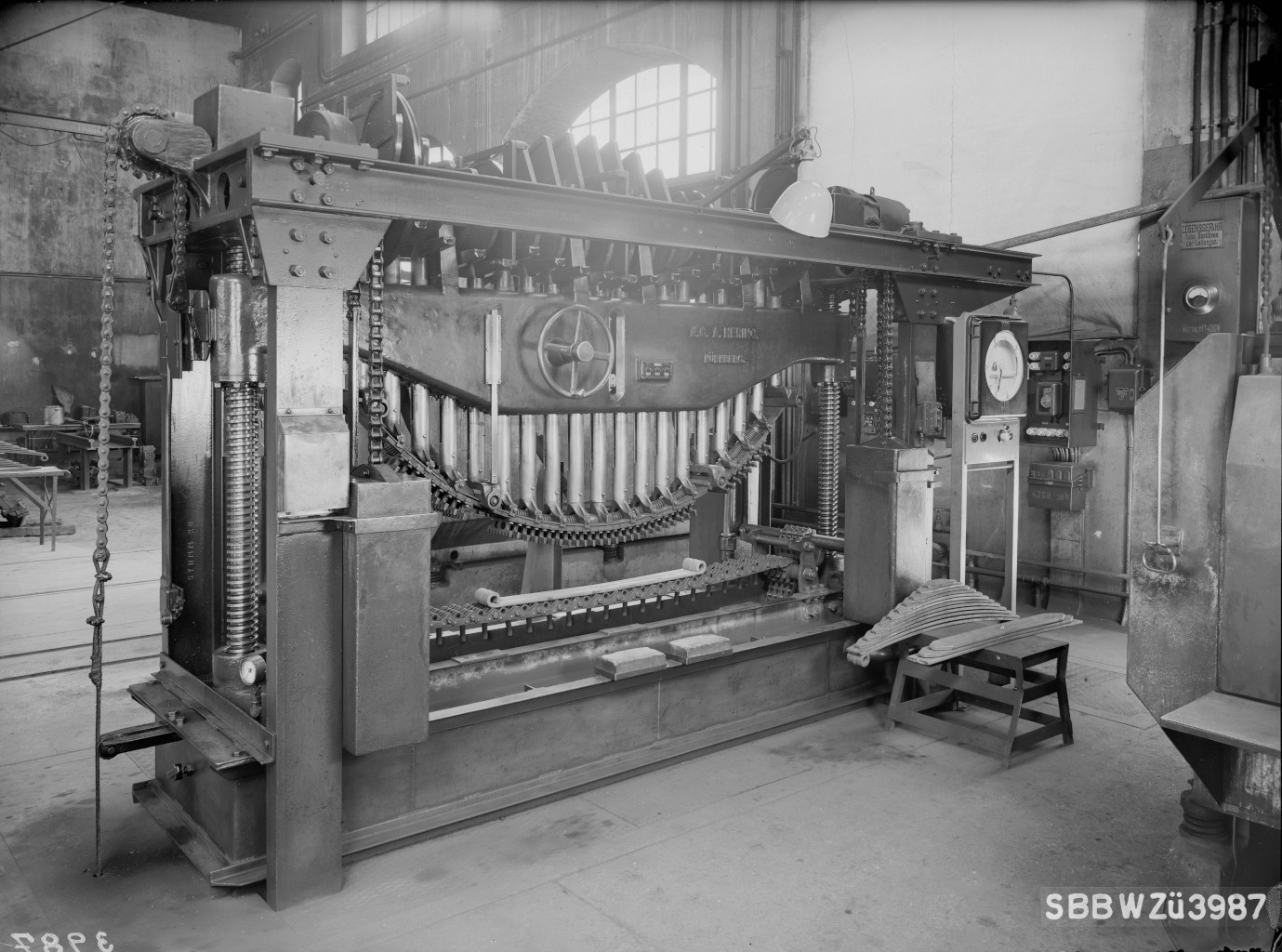
a 1950's bending machine for making Leaf springs.

== CNC bending ==
CNC bending machines are developed for high flexibility and low setup times. Those machines are able to bend single pieces as well as small batches with the same precision and efficiency as series-produced parts in an economical way.

== Universal bending machines – modular construction ==
Universal bending machines consists of a basic machine that can be adjusted with little effort and used for a variety of bends. A simple plug-in system supports quick and easy exchange of tools.

The basic machine consists of a CNC-operated side stop, a work bench, and software for programming and operating. Its modular construction offers an affordable entry into the bending technology, because after an initial investment the machine can be customized and extended later without any conversion. That means the basic machine delivers a bending stroke, and the tool determines the kind of bending.

== Bending tools ==
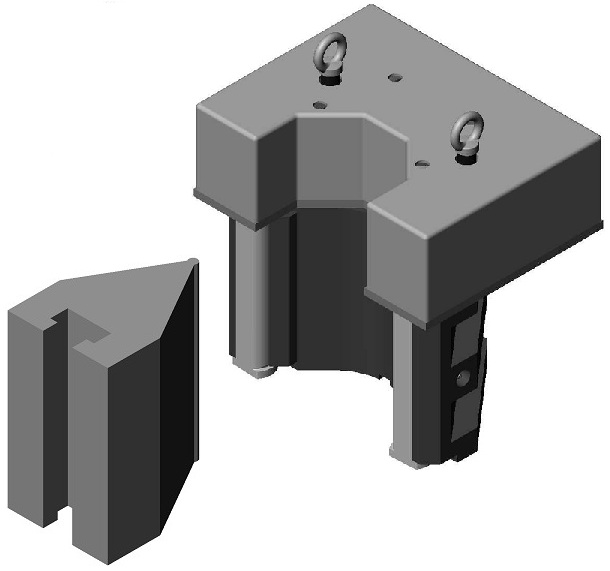
90' bending tool

In the case of bending tools they are classified by the kind of generated bends. They can be constructed to adjust the bending angle by reference, stroke measurement or angle measurement.

CNC machines usually abstain from a reference part. They grant a high bending accuracy starting with the first work piece.

=== Standard bends ===
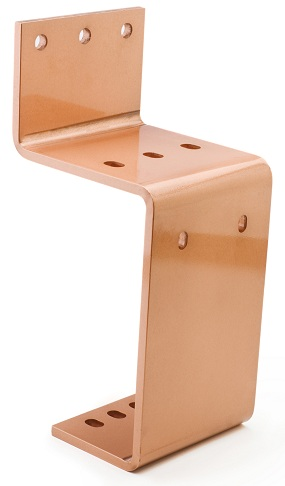
Standard bending with a universal bending machine

All bends without an extraordinary geometry belong to standard bends. The distance between a bend and the material end is quite high providing an adequate bearing area. The same with one bend to the next.

Typical tools are a so-called bending former combined with a prisms with electronic angular measurement or an ordinary prism.

=== U-bending ===
For U-bends where tight and narrow bends are necessary, the bending former is replaced by a bending mandrel. A bending mandrel has a narrow geometry.

=== Offset bending ===
Offset bending tools are used to assemble two bends with a small distance between in one step.

=== Edgewise bending ===
Edge bending tools are used if the bending axis is placed parallel to the tight side of the work piece. Tools for bending on edge may include electronic angular measurement allowing a high bending accuracy.

=== Torsion bending ===
Torsion tools are able to rotate the workpiece on the longitudinal axis. Alternatives are complex assembly groups with standard bends.

=== Angular measurement and spring back compensation ===
For producing single pieces as well as small batches with the same precision and efficiency as series-produced parts, a spring back compensation is helpful. A bending accuracy of +/- 0.2° starting from the first work piece is achieved due to calculated spring back compensation and the use of electronic tools.

=== Operating mode angular measurement ===
Bending prisms with electronic angular measurement technology are equipped with two flattened bending bolds. That bold rotate while bending giving a signal to the angle measurement. The measuring accuracy is about 0.1º. The computer then calculates the required final stroke and spring back of every bend is compensated regardless of material type. A high angle accuracy of +/- 0.2º is achieved instantly with the first workpiece without adjustments. Compared to adjustment by reference, material waste amounts are decreased, because even inconsistencies within a single piece of material are automatically adjusted .

=== Operating mode stroke measurement ===
Wherever bending prisms with electronic angular measurement are not suitable, a small distance between the bends might be a reason, bending prisms without electronic angle measurement are applied. In that case the control unit can be switched from angular measurement to stroke measurement. This method allows the pre-selection of the stroke of the bending ram in mm and therefore the immersion depth of the punch into the prism. Setting accuracy is +/- 0.1 mm. A final stroke is usually not required. Further development of the stroke system enables the user to specify an angle from which the stroke is calculated by using stored stroke functions. Bending accuracy in that case is dependent on material properties such as thickness, hardness, etc. which may differ from one work piece to another.

=== Programming and principle of operation ===
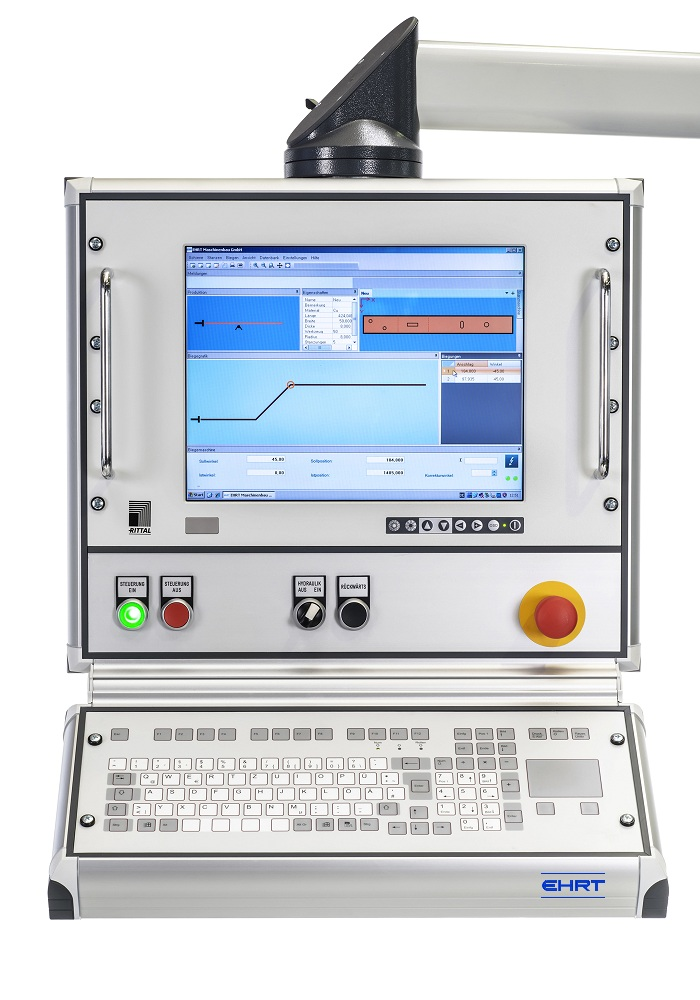
Graphical user interface of a bending machine

Programming is done on a PC equipped with dedicated software, which is part of the machine or connected to an external workstation. For generating a new program engineering data can be imported or pasted per mouse and keyboard. Through a graphic and menu-driven user interface previous CNC programming skills are not required. The software asks for all necessary values and checks all figures. Inputs can be corrected at any time and minimum distances are checked instantly to guard against improper inputs. The software automatically calculates the flat length of each part being bent and determines the exact position of the side stop. The part is shown on a screen.

Ideally each program is stored in one database, so it is easy to recover them by search and sort functions.

== Networking with the whole production line ==
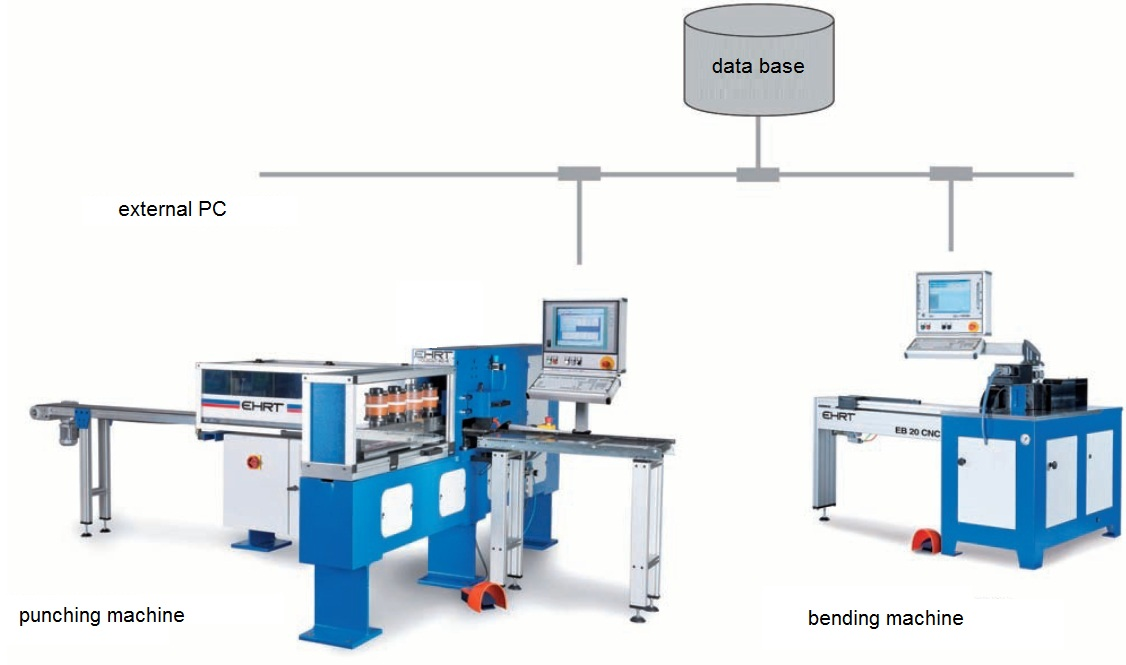
Networking of CNC machines

A lot of organizational effort and interface management is saved, if the CNC bending machine is connected to the previous and subsequent process. For a connection to other machines and external workstations corporate interfaces have to be established.

- One software for programming subsequent production steps at once
- Using a standard industrial PC a variety of machines can be easily networked with among each other
- shared data base for easy integration into existing workflow system and backup at an external server
- import production data from other systems or from construction programs (e.g. DXF files)

=== Networking with a punching machine ===
If a part is bended, in most cases a prior process was inserting holes to mount it in an assembly group. Therefore, a punching machine is an option. Some programs enable the operator to program both step by one software tool.

== See also ==
- Bending
- Brake (sheet metal bending)
- Computer numerical control
