= Brake (sheet metal bending) =

Machine for bending sheet metal

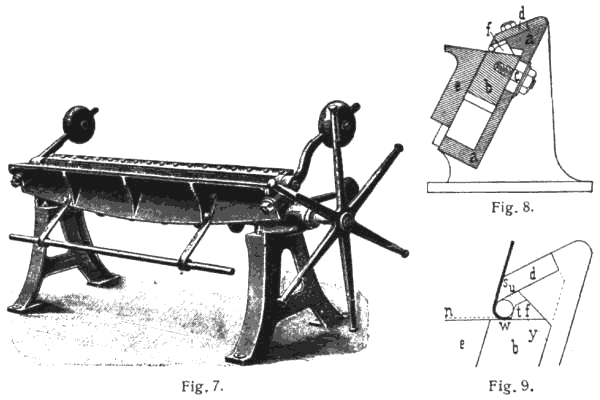
Manually driven bending brake

Cornice brake

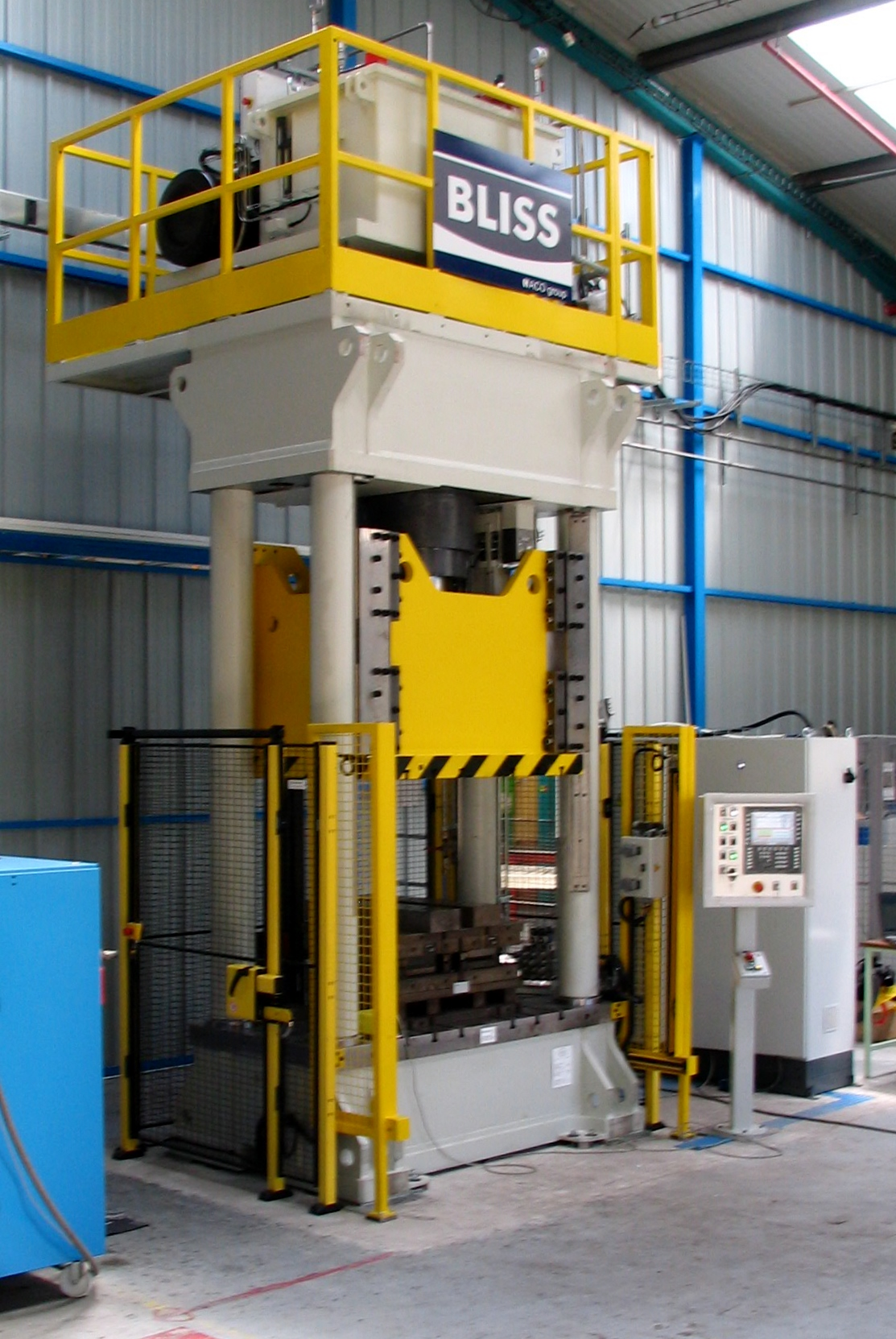
Hydraulic press - 400T

A brake is a metalworking machine that allows the bending of sheet metal. A cornice brake only allows for simple bends and creases, while a box-and-pan brake also allows one to form box and pan shapes. It is also known as a bending machine or bending brake or in Britain as a sheet metal folder or just a folder.

== Description ==
The brake consists of a flat surface onto which the material is placed, and a clamping bar which will come down and hold the material firmly during the bend. This clamping action may be manual, automatic or operated using a foot pedal. The front, gate-like, plate of the machine is hinged and may be lifted, forcing the material extended over a straight edge to bend to follow the plate.

The bends can be to any angle up to a practical limit of about 120 degrees, somewhat more in the case of a bar folder. If the area to be bent is narrow enough, a sharper bend (e.g., for a hem) can be made by inserting the bend under the clamping bar and lowering it.

=== Box-and-pan brake ===
In a box-and-pan brake (also known as a finger brake), the clamping bar includes several removable blocks, which may be removed and rearranged to permit bending of restricted areas of a piece of sheet metal or of already partially formed pieces.

After bending, the box or pan form is then completed by screw, solder, weld, rivet, or other metal fixing process.

=== Bar folder ===
A bar folder is a simplified brake, usually much smaller than a cornice or box-and-pan brake. Typically, a single handle both clamps the workpiece and makes the bend, in a single motion. There is a gauge that can be set up to a depth up to one inch for consistent bends.

Examples of items a bar folder is used to fabricate would be end caps, "s" cleats, and drive cleats.

=== Press brake ===
This is a more complex tool that forms predetermined bends by clamping the workpiece between a matching punch and die.

== Sizes ==
Brakes come in sizes suitable for light aluminum or brass or copper for small boxes and operated by hand, up to industrial sized and counterweighted hand-operated or hydraulic machines suitable for large sheets of steel.
