= Semi-finished casting products =

Intermediate casting type

Semi-finished casting products are intermediate castings produced in a steel mill that need further processing before being finished goods. There are four types: ingots, blooms, billets, and slabs.

== Ingot ==
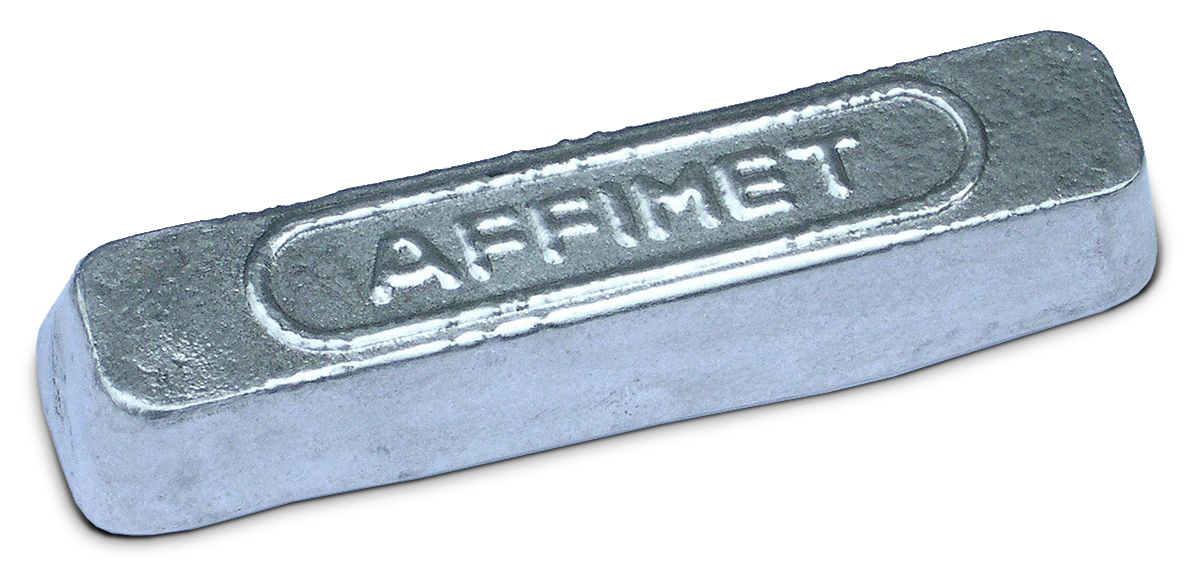
An aluminium ingot

Ingots are large rough castings designed for storage and transportation. The shape usually resembles a rectangle or square with generous fillets. They are tapered, usually with the big-end-down.

== Bloom ==
In the era of commercial wrought iron, blooms were slag-riddled iron castings poured in a bloomery before being worked into wrought iron. In the era of commercial steel, blooms are intermediate-stage pieces of steel produced by a first pass of rolling (in a blooming mill) that works the ingots down to a smaller cross-sectional area, but still greater than 36 in^{2} (230 cm^{2}). Blooms are usually further processed via rotary piercing, structural shape rolling and profile rolling. Common final products include structural shapes, rails, rods, and seamless pipes.

== Billet ==
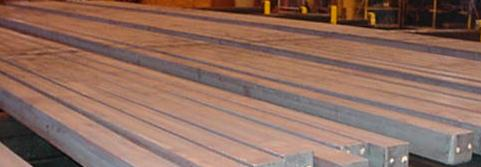
Steel billets

A billet is a length of metal that has a round or square cross-section, with an area less than 36 in^{2} (230 cm^{2}). Billets are created directly via continuous casting or extrusion or indirectly via hot rolling an ingot or bloom. Billets are further processed via profile rolling and drawing. Final products include bar stock and wire.

Centrifugal casting is also used to produce short circular tubes as billets, usually to achieve a precise metallurgical structure. They are commonly used as cylinder sleeves where the inner and outer diameters are ground and machined to length. Because their size is not modified significantly, they are not always classified as semi-finished casting products.

== Slab ==
A slab is a length of metal that is rectangular in cross-section. The slab is created directly by continuous casting or indirectly by rolling an ingot on a slabbing mill. Slabs are usually further processed via flat rolling, skelping, and pipe rolling. Common final products include sheet metal, plates, strip metal, pipes, and tubes. Slab are mainly produced through blast furnace route. One of the reasons to preferably produce slab through BF route is to achieve high quality.

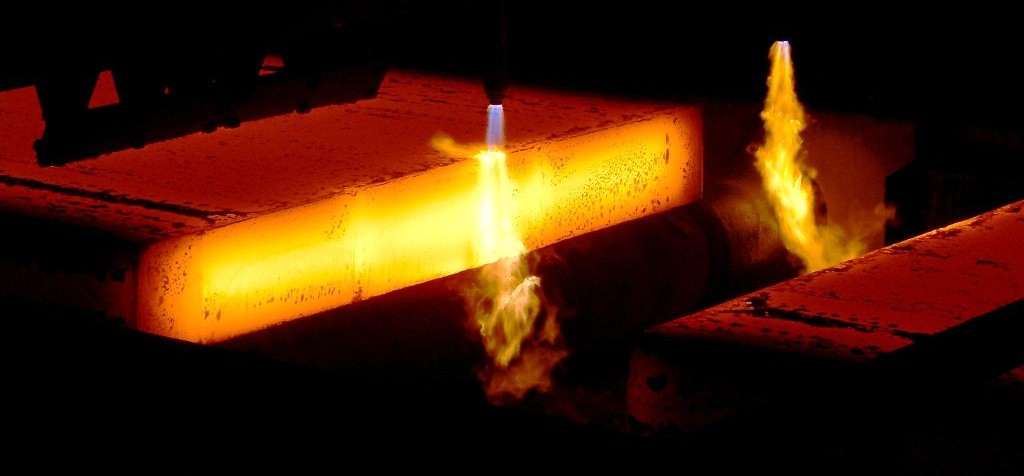
An oxygen gas torch cutting a slab

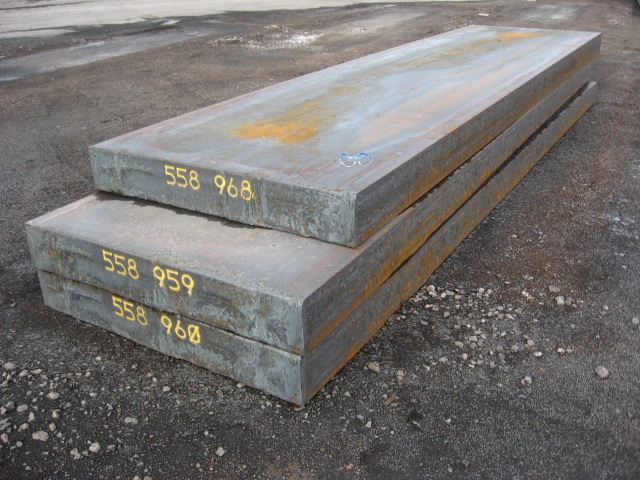
Steel slabs
