= Drawing (manufacturing) =

Use of tensile forces to elongate a workpiece

Diagram of bar drawing; the workpiece is pulled from left (tension) rather than pushed from the right (compression).

Drawing is a manufacturing process that uses tensile forces to elongate metal, glass, or plastic. As the material is drawn (pulled), it stretches and becomes thinner, achieving a desired shape and thickness. Drawing is classified into two types: sheet metal drawing and wire, bar, and tube drawing. Sheet metal drawing is defined as a plastic deformation over a curved axis. For wire, bar, and tube drawing, the starting stock is drawn through a die to reduce its diameter and increase its length. Drawing is usually performed at room temperature, thus classified as a cold working process; however, drawing may also be performed at higher temperatures to hot work large wires, rods, or hollow tubes in order to reduce forces.

Drawing differs from rolling in that pressure is not applied by the turning action of a mill but instead depends on force applied locally near the area of compression. This means the maximal drawing force is limited by the tensile strength of the material, a fact particularly evident when drawing thin wires.

The starting point of cold drawing is hot-rolled stock of a suitable size.

== Metal ==
Successful drawing depends on the flow and stretch of the material. Steels, copper alloys, and aluminium alloys are commonly drawn metals.

In sheet metal drawing, as a die forms a shape from a flat sheet of metal (the "blank"), the material is forced to move and conform to the die. The flow of material is controlled through pressure applied to the blank and lubrication applied to the die or the blank. If the form moves too easily, wrinkles will occur in the part. To correct this, more pressure or less lubrication is applied to the blank to limit the flow of material and cause the material to stretch or become thin. If too much pressure is applied, the part will become too thin and break. Drawing metal requires finding the correct balance between wrinkles and breaking to achieve a successful part.

Sheet metal drawing becomes deep drawing when the workpiece is longer than its diameter. It is common that the workpiece is also processed using other forming processes, such as piercing, ironing, necking, rolling, and beading. In shallow drawing, the depth of drawing is less than the smallest dimension of the hole.

Bar, tube, and wire drawing all work upon the same principle: the starting stock is drawn through a die to reduce its diameter and increase its length. Usually, the die is mounted on a draw bench. The starting end of the workpiece is narrowed or pointed to get the end through the die. The end is then placed in grips which pull the rest of the workpiece through the die.

Drawing can also be used to cold form a shaped cross-section. Cold drawn cross-sections are more precise and have a better surface finish than hot extruded parts. Inexpensive materials can be used instead of expensive alloys for strength requirements, due to work hardening. Bars or rods that are drawn cannot be coiled; therefore, straight-pull draw benches are used. Chain drives are used to draw workpieces up to 30 m (98 ft). Hydraulic cylinders are used for shorter length workpieces. The reduction in area is usually restricted to between 20% and 50%, because greater reductions would exceed the tensile strength of the material, depending on its ductility. To achieve a certain size or shape, multiple passes through progressively smaller dies and intermediate anneals may be required. Tube drawing is very similar to bar drawing, except the beginning stock is a tube. It is used to decrease the diameter, improve surface finish, and improve dimensional accuracy. A mandrel may or may not be used depending on the specific process used. A floating plug may also be inserted into the inside diameter of the tube to control the wall thickness. Wire drawing has long been used to produce flexible metal wire by drawing the material through a series of dies of decreasing size. These dies are manufactured from a number of materials, the most common being tungsten carbide and diamond.

The cold drawing process for steel bars and wire is as follows:

1. Tube lubrication: The surface of the bar or tube is coated with a drawing lubricant such as phosphate or oil to aid cold drawing.
2. Push pointing: Several inches of the lead ends of the bar or tube are reduced in size by swaging or extruding so that it can pass freely through the drawing die. This is done because the die opening is always smaller in size than the original bar or coil section.
3. Cold drawing, process drawing: In this process, the material is drawn at room temperature. The reduced end of the bar or coil, which is smaller than the die opening, is passed through the die where it enters a gripping device of the drawing machine. The drawing machine pulls ("draws") the remaining unreduced section of the bar or coil through the die. The die reduces the cross section of the bar or coil, shapes its profile, and increases its length.
4. Finished product: The drawn product, which is referred to as "cold drawn" or "cold finished", exhibits a bright or polished finish, increased mechanical properties, improved machining characteristics, and precise and uniform dimensional tolerances.
5. Multi-pass drawing: The cold drawing of complex shapes or profiles may involve the workpiece being drawn multiple times through progressively smaller die openings in order to produce the desired shape and tolerances. Material is generally annealed between each drawing pass to increase its ductility and remove internal stresses produced during the cold working.
6. Annealing: This is a thermal treatment generally used to soften the material being drawn; to modify the microstructure, the mechanical properties, and the machining characteristics of the steel; and to remove internal stresses in the product. Depending on the material and desired final characteristics, annealing may be used before, during (between passes), or after the cold drawing operation.

== Glass ==
Similar drawing processes are applied in glassblowing and in making glass optical fiber.

== Plastics ==
Plastic drawing, sometimes referred to as cold drawing, is the same process as used on metal bars, applied to plastics. Plastic drawing is primarily used in manufacturing plastic fibers. The process was discovered by Julian W. Hill in 1930 while trying to make fibers from an early polyester.

It is performed after the material has been "spun" into filaments; by extruding the polymer melt through pores of a spinneret. During this process, the individual polymer chains tend to somewhat align because of viscous flow. These filaments still have an amorphous structure, so they are drawn to align the fibers further, thus increasing crystallinity, tensile strength, and stiffness. This is done on a draw twister machine. For nylon, the fiber is stretched to four times its spun length. The crystals formed during drawing are held together by hydrogen bonds between the amide hydrogens of one chain and the carbonyl oxygens of another chain. Polyethylene terephthalate (PET) sheet is drawn in two dimensions to make BoPET (biaxially-oriented polyethylene terephthalate) with improved mechanical properties.

== See also ==
- Extrusion
