= Drawer =

Box-shaped container that fits into a piece of furniture

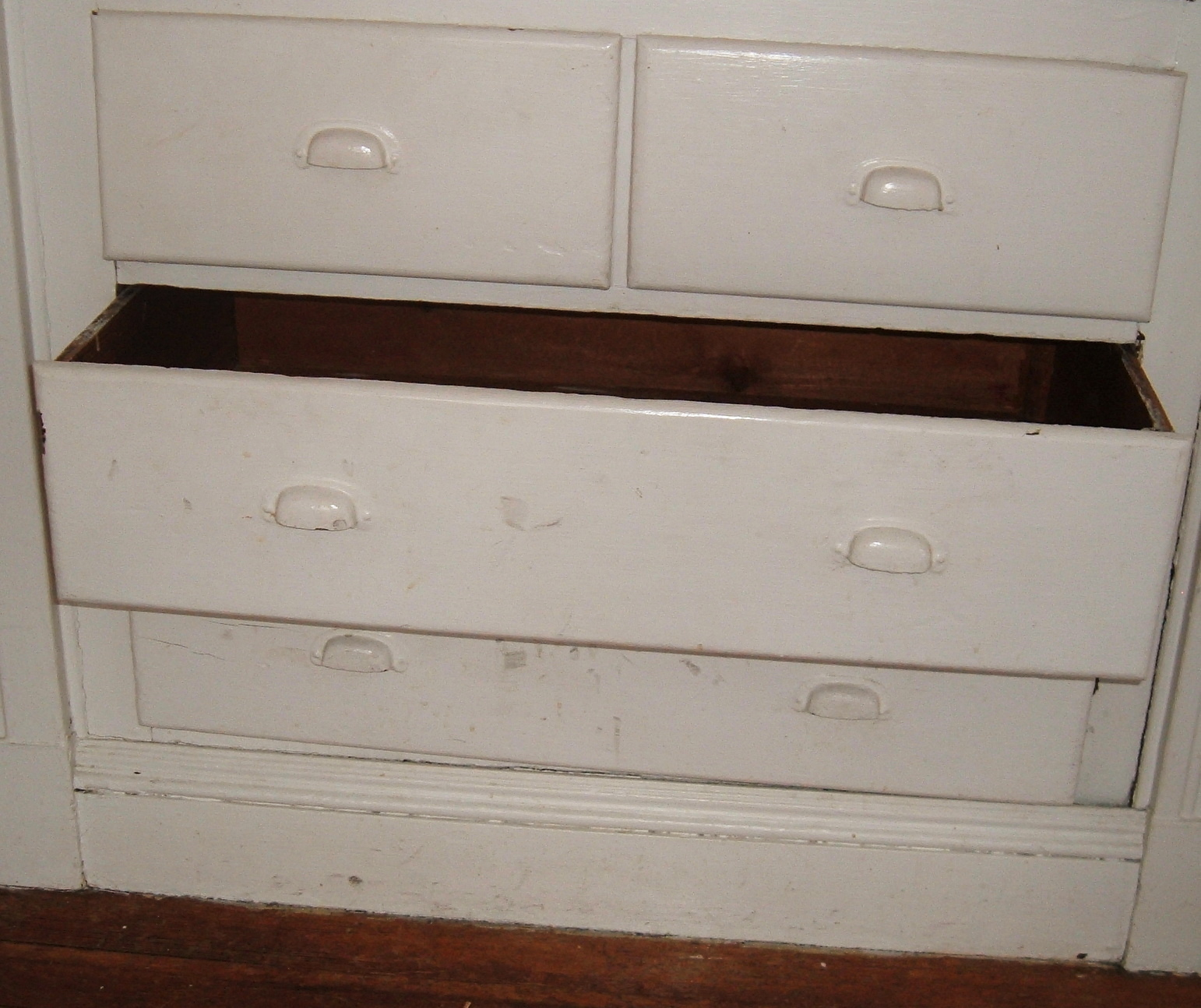
A white wooden drawer

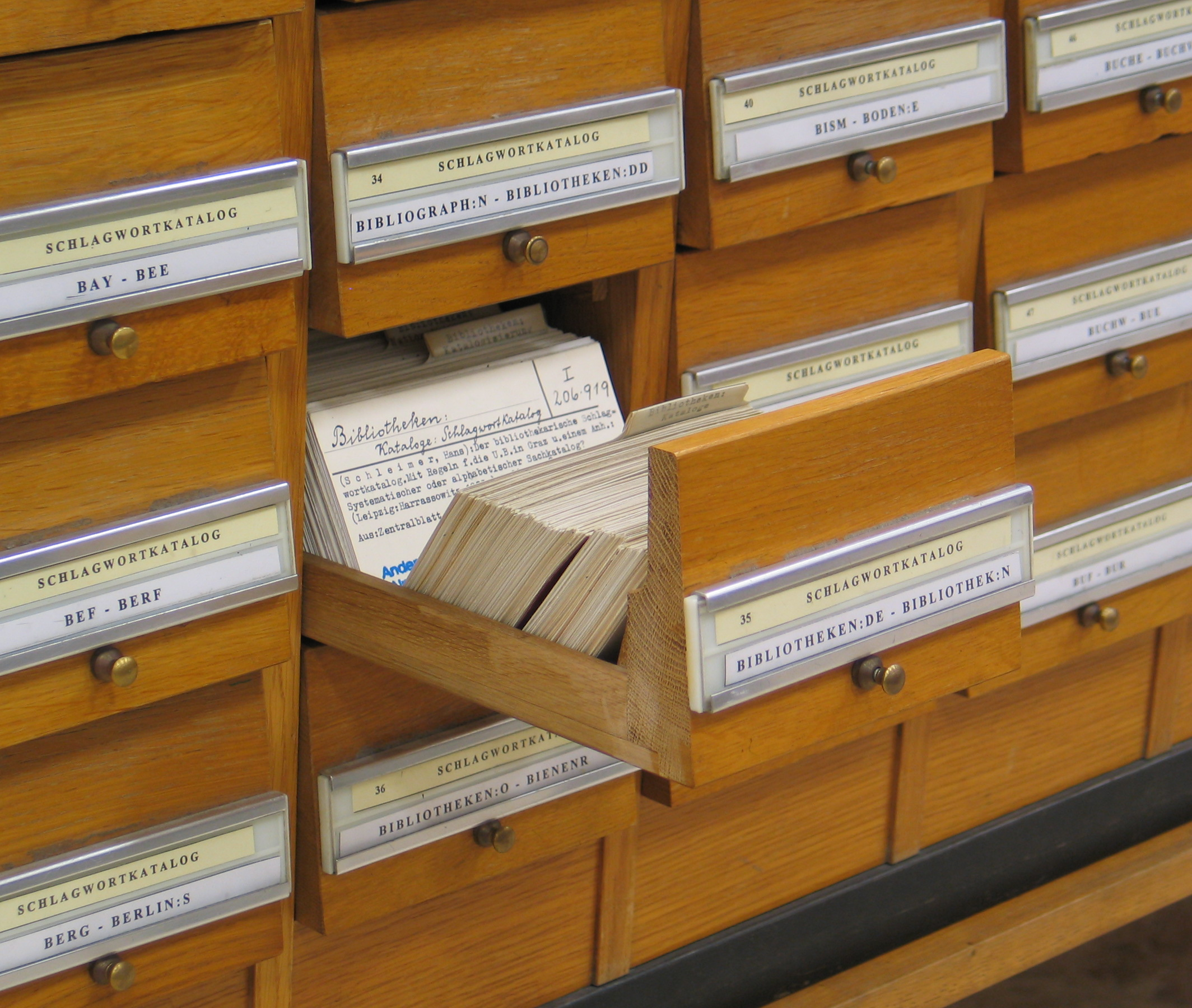
Filing card drawer

A drawer (/drɔːr/ DROR) is a box-shaped container inside a piece of furniture that can be pulled out horizontally to access its contents. Drawers are built into numerous types of furniture, including cabinets, chests of drawers (bureaus), desks, and the like.

== Construction ==
Drawers can be built in various ways using a variety of materials, including wood, various wood composites, sheet metal, and plastic.

Wooden drawers are often crafted with a seamless front face, concealing the end grain from the side panels. The corners may feature dovetail joints for added strength or aesthetic appeal, with half-blind dovetail joints commonly used at the front corners to conceal the joint. To secure the bottom piece, a groove is typically cut into the four vertical sides to hold the drawer bottom in place.

== Handles and locks ==
One or two handles or drawer pulls are commonly attached to the front face of the drawer to facilitate pulling it out from its enclosure. In some cases, drawers may have another means by which to pull it, including holes cut in the front face or a hollowed-out area to insert the fingers on the bottom side of its front.

Some drawers can be locked, notably in filing cabinet and desk drawers.

== Movement ==
Drawer slides often have a mechanism to keep the drawer from accidentally being pulled fully from its enclosure.

With the simplest kinds of mounting, the drawer cannot be pulled out sufficiently to see the full interior, without pulling the drawer completely out of the cabinet, often leading to the contents being dumped on the floor. There are at least two ways to make the full interior of a drawer visible, while still being completely supported by the cabinet. One way places the back of the drawer such that it is fully visible when the drawer hits the stop—the interior of such a drawer is much shorter than the sides of the drawer. That visible back of the drawer may be a false back that conceals a secret hiding place behind it. Another way uses full extension drawers, which have full-extension drawer slides, also called telescoping slides, a kind of linear-motion bearing § Compound slides that support the drawer even when the drawer is pulled entirely out of the cabinet.

== Drawer slides ==
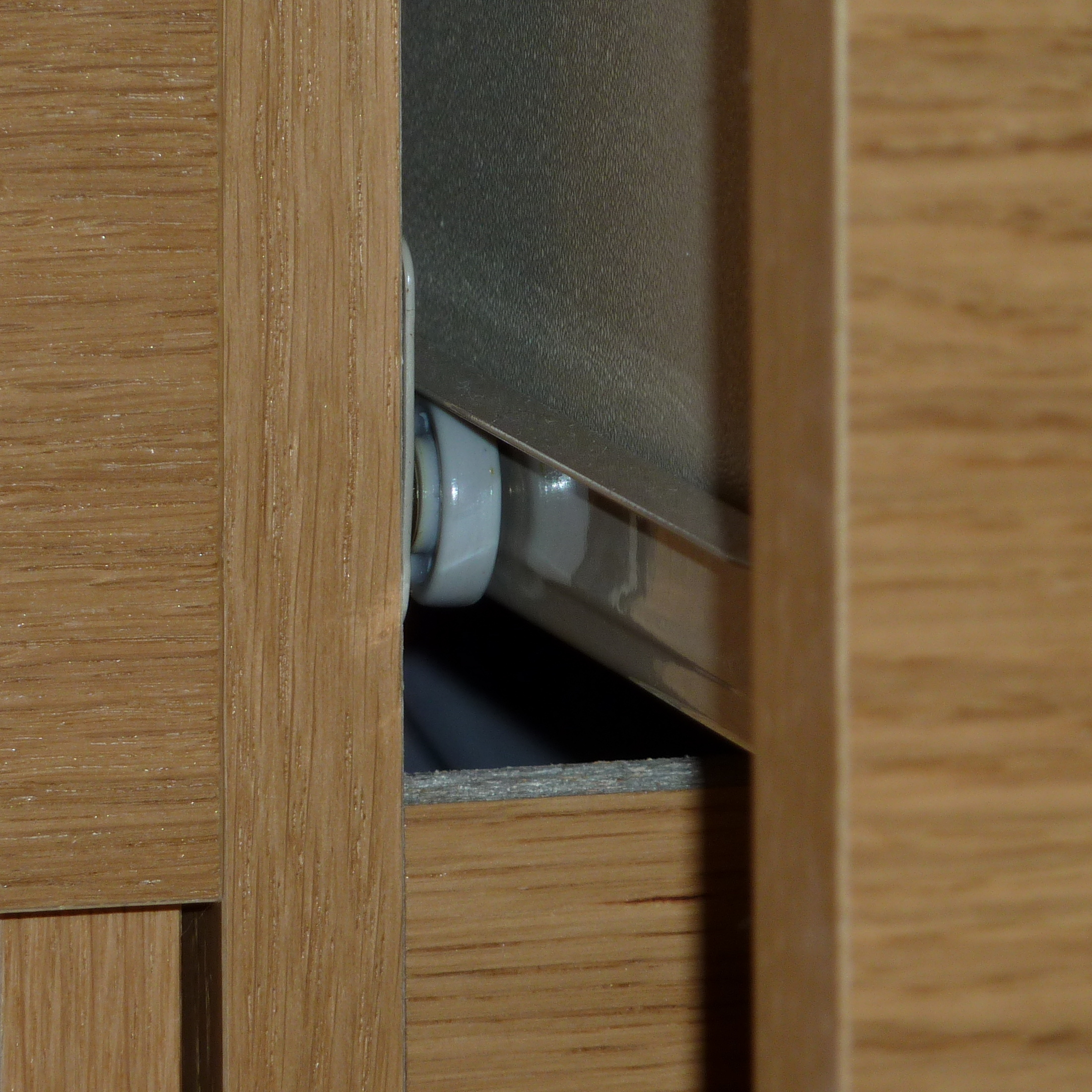
Closeup photo of drawer slides mounted in a drawer.

A drawer slide or drawer runner is the part of a drawer that allows it to move. There are various types of slide mechanisms with different features, for different uses, at different price points.

=== Uses ===
Examples of uses are in home furniture hardware, office appliances, and industrial equipment, including kitchen cabinets, oven slides, rails for sliding doors, and fridge slides (for coolers).

=== Performance metrics ===
A good slide rail is defined by smoothness, tight tolerance and load capacity.

=== Types by slide mechanism ===
Wooden slides
The drawer rests directly on the cabinet.
Wheel drawer slide
A wheel drawer or roller runner slide (sometimes called a European-style slide) is a simple mechanism that can handle heavy loads. However, the drawer cannot be fully extended, except when removing it.
Ball bearing slides
Ball bearing or steel ball slides have ball bearings to make drawers slide more smoothly.
Telescoping ball bearing drawer slides
Telescopic channel slides allow for full extension of the drawer during normal use, and therefore better access to the space inside it. They are manufactured using a roll forming machine, and consist of outer, middle and inner rails. They can be made with a soft-close mechanism. They are also called 3-section slides, as opposed to 2-section ball bearing slides which cannot be fully opened.

=== Types by mounting or placement ===
Side-mounted slide
Most drawer slides are side-mounted, leaving them visible when the drawer is opened. Concealed slides are generally mounted on the underside of the drawer:
Under-mounted slide
Also called bottom-mounted slides, they are mounted out by the sides on the bottom of the drawer, leaving them concealed when the drawer is opened. Under-mounted slides of the ball bearing type can include a soft-close mechanism. Due to its more complex form factor, under-mounted slides usually cost more than side-mounted slides.
Center-mounted slide
Center-mounted slides are mounted near the bottom center of the drawer, and are therefore also usually concealed when the drawer is opened. They are often limited to lighter loads than other types of slides.

=== Soft close ===
A soft-close mechanism is a special feature that slows the drawer's velocity in the last part of closing, then closes it automatically. The user gives the drawer a gentle push to engage the mechanism, and the drawer closes smoothly and quietly without the possibility of slamming.

=== Gallery ===
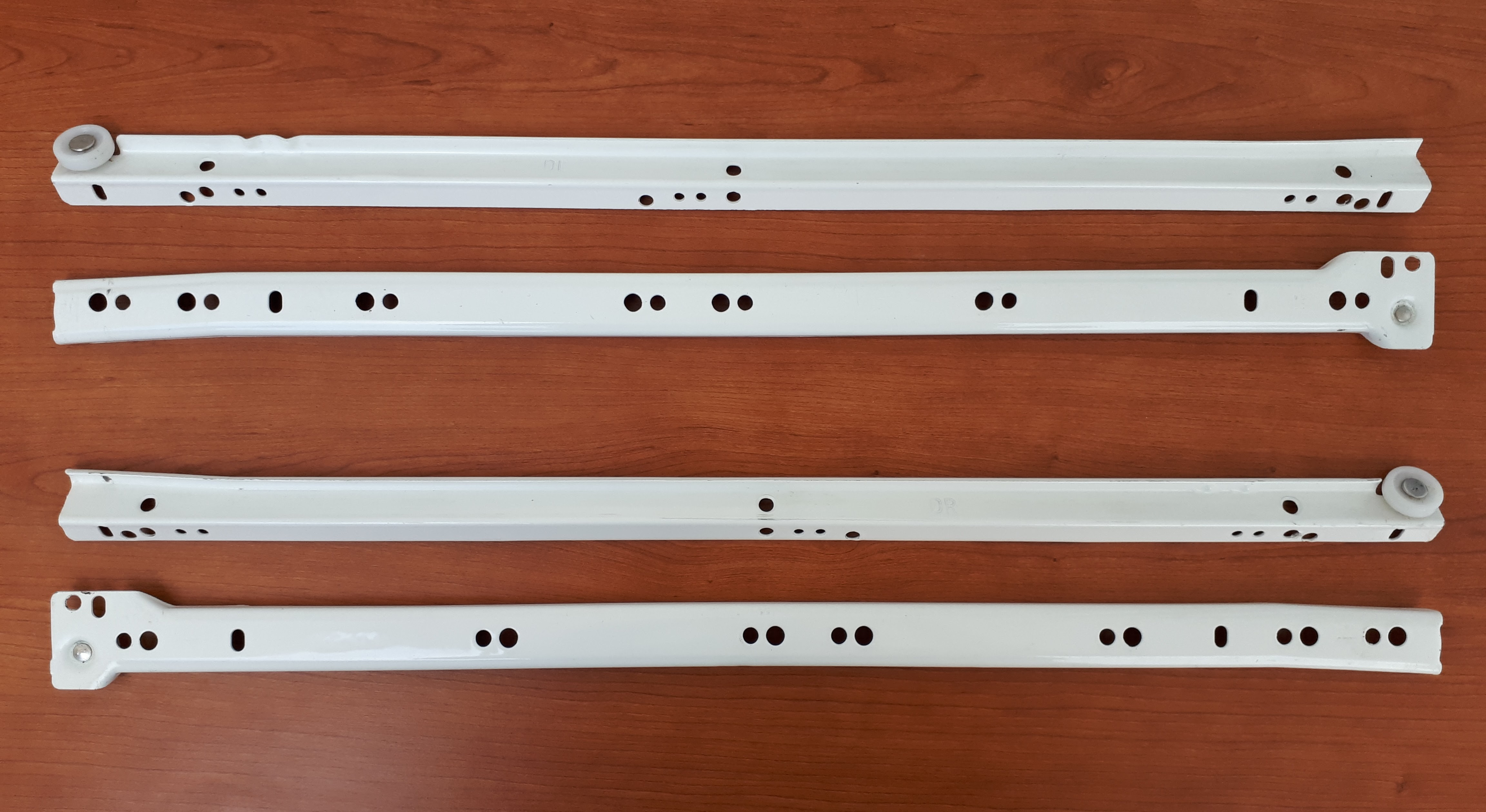
Simple drawer slide with wheels instead of ball bearings

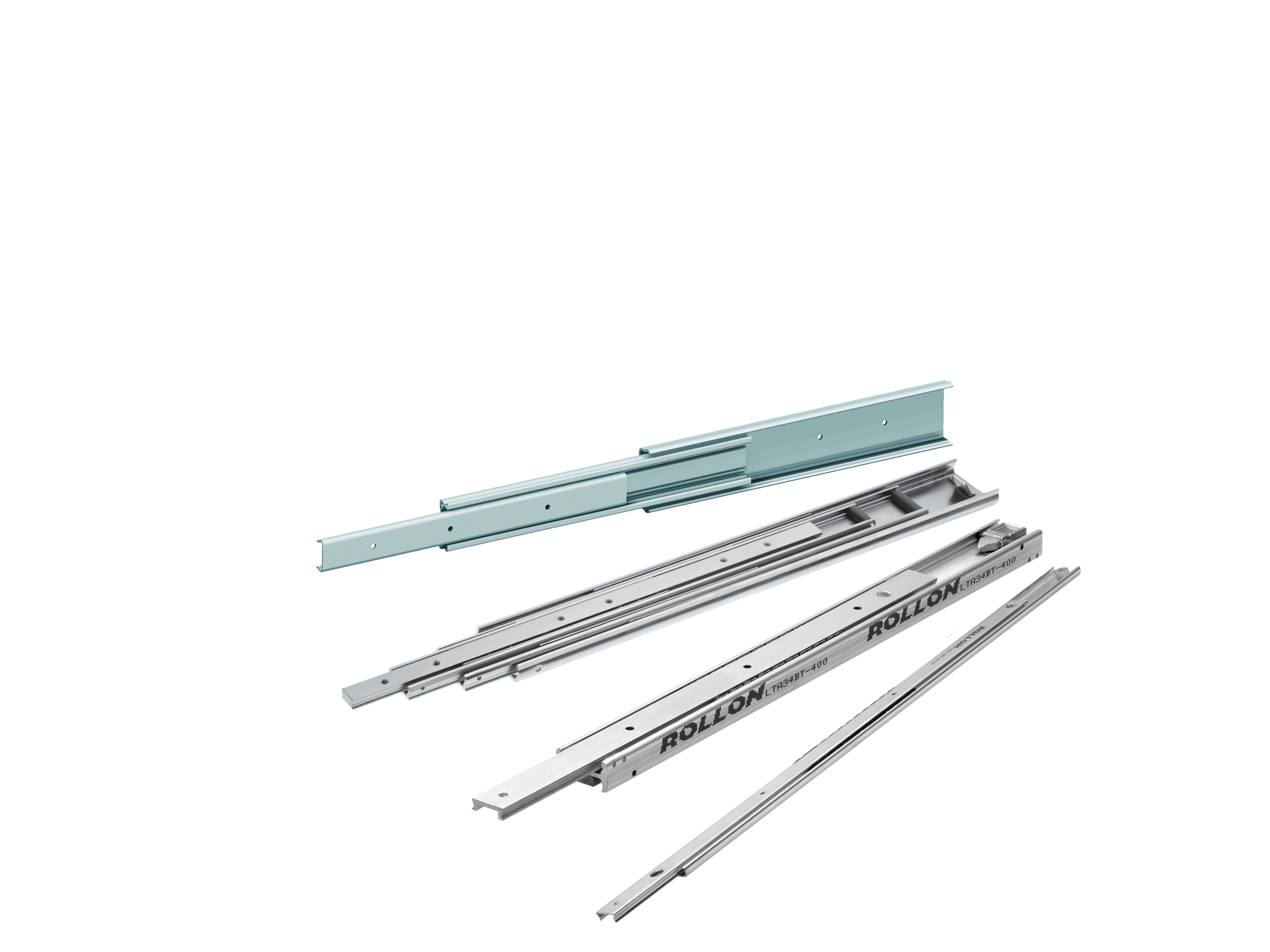
Telescopic drawer slides with ball bearings

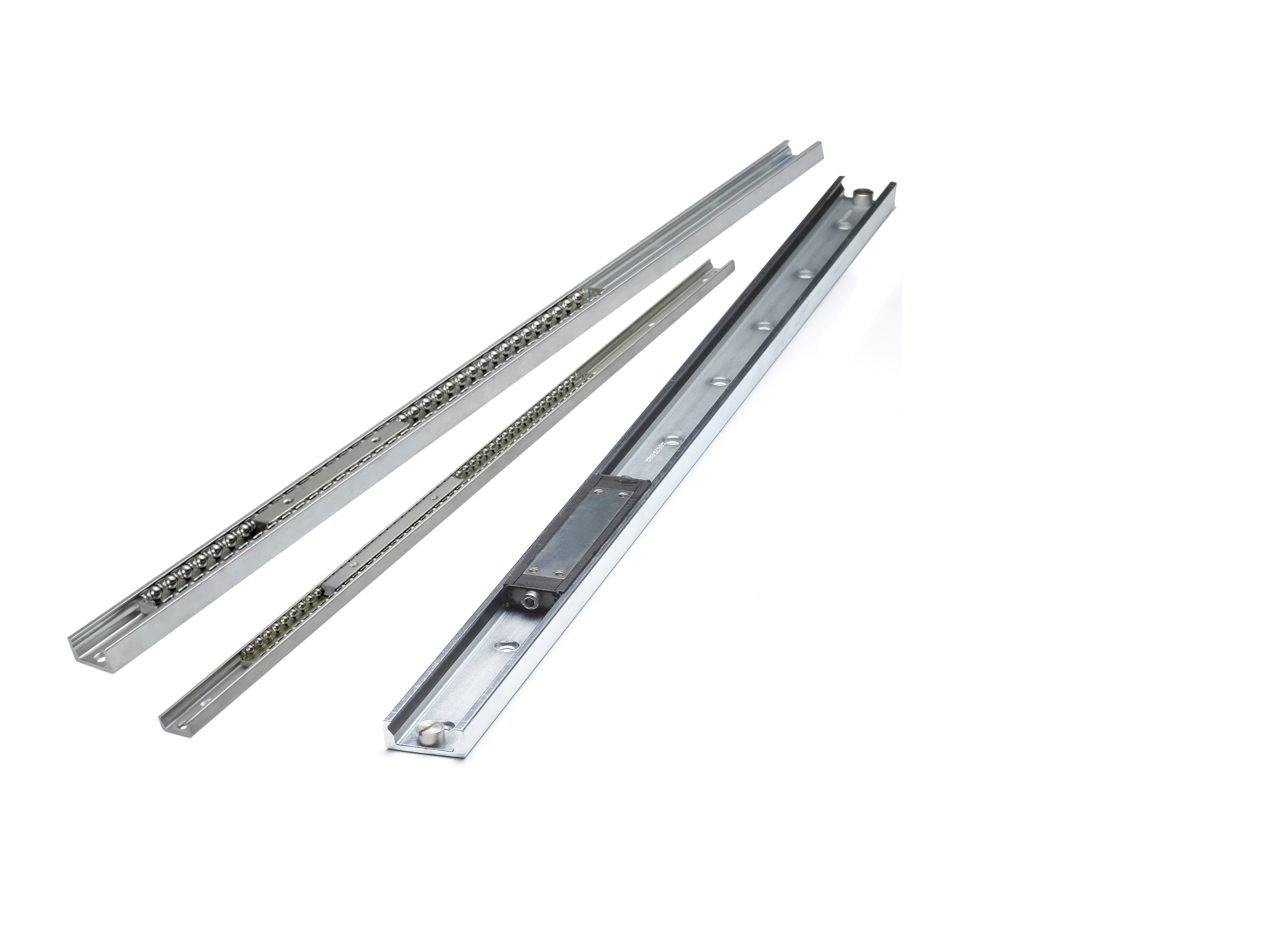
Roller bearing slides

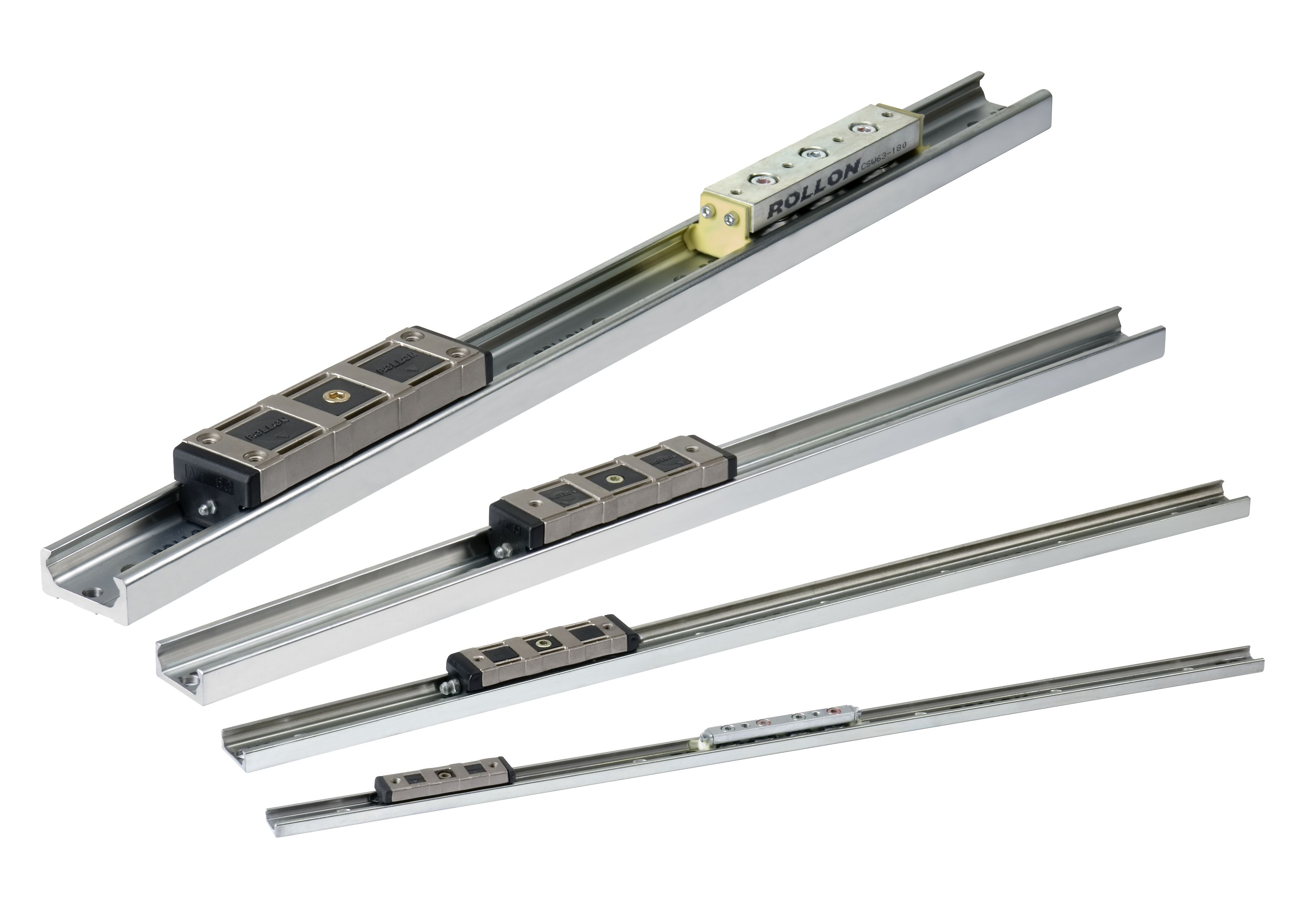
Industrial profile rail guides

== See also ==
- Cash drawer
- Drawer slides roll forming machine
- False bottom
- Junk drawer
- Roll-out shelf
