= Draw twister =

A draw twister is a machine used to draw and twist large quantities of polymer fibers. It uses two sets of rollers, where the second set rotates faster than the first, thus drawing the fiber between them. While the fibers are being drawn they are also twisted into thread.
