= Rotary piercing =

Hot working metalworking process for forming thick-walled seamless tubing

Rotary piercing is a hot working metalworking process for forming thick-walled seamless tubing. There are two types: the Mannesmann process, invented in the 1880s, and the Stiefel process, developed two decades later.

== Mannesmann process ==
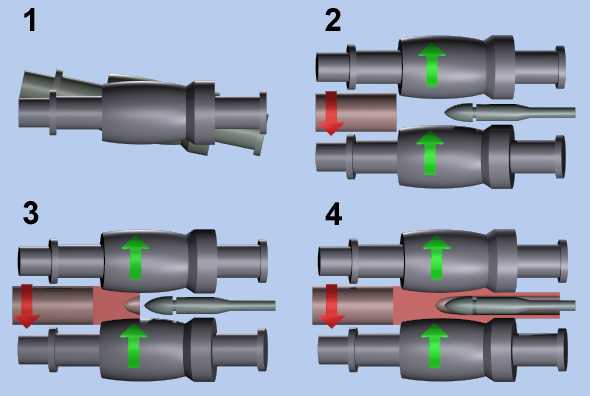
A schematic of rotary piercing. Key: 1. Roller configuration; 2. The process starts with the blank fed in from the left.; 3. The stresses induced by the rolls causes the center of the blank to fracture.; 4. Finally, the rolls push the blank over the mandrel to form a uniform inner diameter.

A heated cylindrical billet workpiece is fed between two convex-tapered rollers, which are rotating in the same direction. The rollers are usually 6° askew from parallel with the billet's axis. The rollers are on opposite sides of the billet, and the surface of their largest cross sections are separated by a distance slightly smaller than the outside diameter (OD) of the original billet. The load imparted by the rollers compresses the material and the 6° skew provides both rotation and translation to the billet. The friction between the rollers and the billet is intentionally high, and is sometimes increased by using knurled rollers. This friction establishes stresses varying radially through the billet, with the highest stresses at the outer surface and the central axis. The stress exceeds the yield strength of the billet and causes circumferential fissures to propagate at various radii near the outer surface, and a central longitudinal void to form at the axis. A tapered mandrel is set inside and a short distance from the start of the central void. This mandrel forces the material outward and compresses the material against the back side of the tapered rollers. This compressive loading fuses the circumferential fissures and sets the initial internal and external diameter values. The formed tube is then cooled and can be cold worked to refine the diameters and to achieve the desired yield strengths.

Mannesmann mills can produce tubes as large as 300 mm (12 in) in diameter.

== Stiefel process ==
The Stiefel process is very similar to the Mannesmann process, except that the convex rollers are replaced with large conical disks. This allows for larger tubes to be forged.
