= Drawer slides roll forming machine =

A drawer slide roll forming machine is a cold roll forming machine used to manufacture drawer slides. They have similarities with roofing roll formed products, but require a higher performance and skills in profile forming.

These machines are also known under various names such as slide rail making machine, slide make machine and telescopic channel roll forming equipment.

== Process of slide roll forming ==
The basic production flow of drawer slide machine is roll forming, punching, and cut off to length.

Processes of drawer slides roll forming is a continuous cold rolled steel strip passing through a plurality set of upper and lower shaped rollers, and then punching, embossing, straightening, and cut off to length. Straightening is an important part to avoid material twisting or curling. A roll forming line is often provided with straightening mechanism to make sure the material is nicely formed in a predetermined shape to meet the original design.

Every slide rail varies in some detailed design, which requires a customized production line to meet the expected profile. This means that the manufacture of a different types of roll slides may require a different machine or reconfiguration of the setup. The development takes time and costs, especially for undermount drawer slides. The profile is not as easy as contoured profile like roofing; in other words, slides roll forming requires advanced technology in manufacturing.

One disadvantage of drawer slides roll forming equipment is rollers can be only used to roll form one kind of profile design, which rollers must be changed when making different types or model of drawer slides profile. Complicated designs can incur large costs.

== Types of drawer slides ==
A drawer slide or drawer runner is the part of a drawer which allows the sliding movement. Examples of uses are in home furniture hardware, office appliance, and industrial equipment, including kitchen cabinets, oven slides, rails for sliding doors, fridge slides (used for coolers, etc.

There are various types of drawer slide in the market to apply for different usages, price points and features. A good slide rail defined by smoothness, tight tolerance, and loading capacity.

Features which may be incorporated in a drawer slide include:

- Telescopic channel slide, which allow the drawer to be fully extended and consist of outer, middle and inner rails. These are also called 3-section slides, as opposed to 2-section slides which can not be opened fully.
- Concealed slides or undermount slide rails, which are generally mounted on the underside of the drawer and therefore is not visible from either the side or above when the drawer is opened
- Ball bearing slide or steel ball slides, which have ball bearings to make the drawers slide easier
- Soft close, a feature which brakes the drawer velocity in the last part of closing, and thereafter closes itself

== See also ==
- Roll forming
- Drawer slides
