= Hot working =

Any metal shaping process occurring above its recrystallization temperature

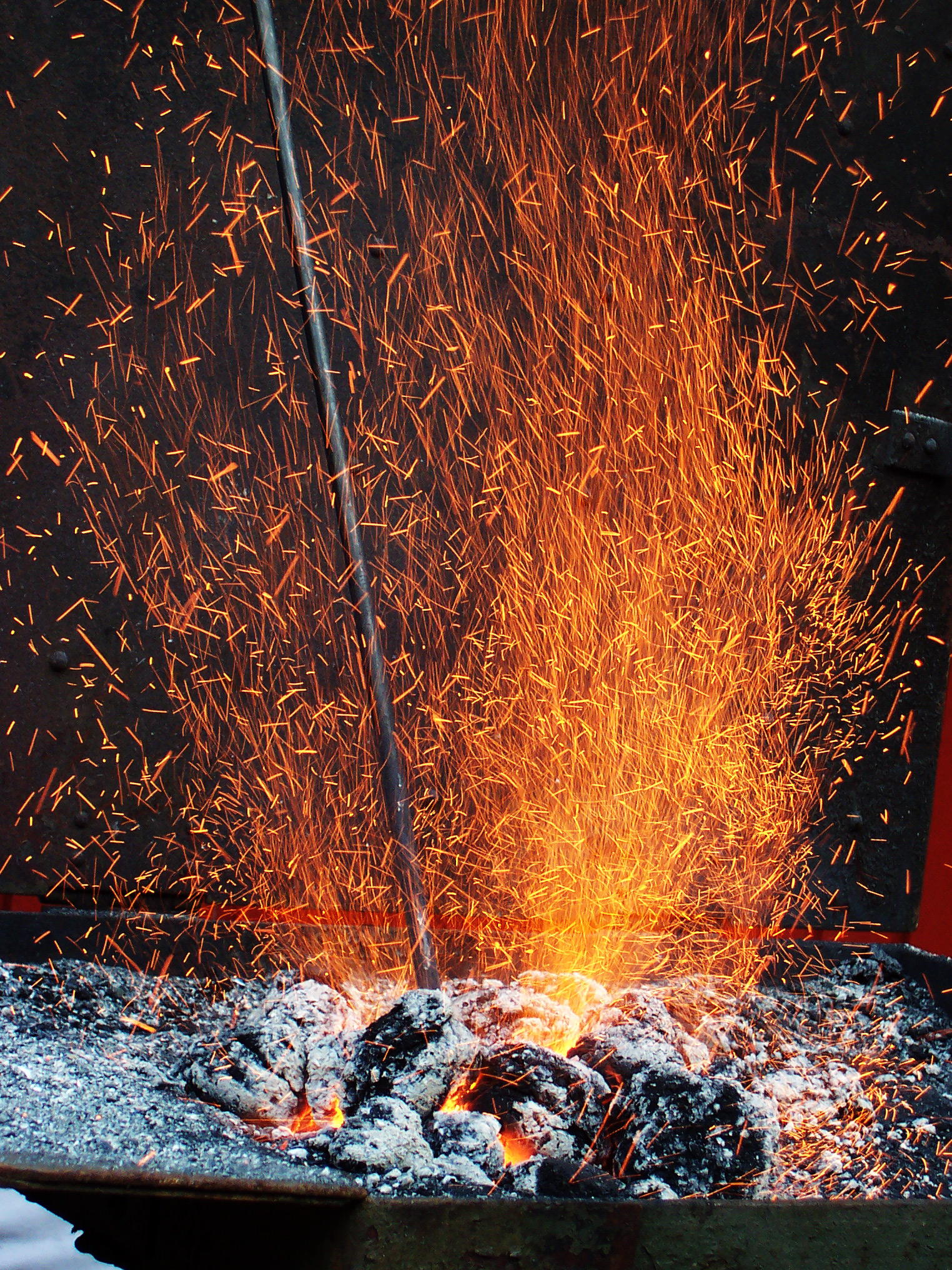
A forge fire for hot working of metal

In metallurgy, hot working refers to processes where metals are plastically deformed above their recrystallization temperature. Being above the recrystallization temperature allows the material to recrystallize during deformation. This is important because recrystallization keeps the materials from strain hardening, which ultimately keeps the yield strength and hardness low and ductility high. This contrasts with cold working.

Many kinds of working, including rolling, forging, extrusion, and drawing, can be done with hot metal.

== Temperature ==
The lower limit of the hot working temperature is determined by its recrystallization temperature. As a guideline, the lower limit of the hot working temperature of a material is 60% its melting temperature (on an absolute temperature scale). The upper limit for hot working is determined by various factors, such as: excessive oxidation, grain growth, or an undesirable phase transformation. In practice materials are usually heated to the upper limit first to keep forming forces as low as possible and to maximize the amount of time available to hot work the workpiece.

The most important aspect of any hot working process is controlling the temperature of the workpiece. 90% of the energy imparted into the workpiece is converted into heat. Therefore, if the deformation process is quick enough the temperature of the workpiece should rise, however, this does not usually happen in practice. Most of the heat is lost through the surface of the workpiece into the cooler tooling. This causes temperature gradients in the workpiece, usually due to non-uniform cross-sections where the thinner sections are cooler than the thicker sections. Ultimately, this can lead to cracking in the cooler, less ductile surfaces. One way to minimize the problem is to heat the tooling. The hotter the tooling the less heat lost to it, but as the tooling temperature rises, the tool life decreases. Therefore, the tooling temperature must be compromised; commonly, hot working tooling is heated to 500–850 °F (260–454 °C).

Lower limit hot working temperature for various metals
Metal	Temperature
Tin	Room temperature
Steel	2,000 °F (1,090 °C)
Tungsten	4,000 °F (2,200 °C)

== Advantages and disadvantages ==
The advantages are:

- Decrease in yield strength, therefore it is easier to work and uses less energy or force
- Increase in ductility
- Elevated temperatures increase diffusion which can remove or reduce chemical inhomogeneities
- Pores may reduce in size or close completely during deformation
- In steel, the weak, ductile, face-centered-cubic austenite microstructure is deformed instead of the strong body-centered-cubic ferrite microstructure found at lower temperatures

Usually the initial workpiece that is hot worked was originally cast. The microstructure of cast items does not optimize the engineering properties, from a microstructure standpoint. Hot working improves the engineering properties of the workpiece because it replaces the microstructure with one that has fine spherical shaped grains. These grains increase the strength, ductility, and toughness of the material.

The engineering properties can also be improved by reorienting the inclusions (impurities). In the cast state the inclusions are randomly oriented, which, when intersecting the surface, can be a propagation point for cracks. When the material is hot worked the inclusions tend to flow with the contour of the surface, creating stringers. As a whole the strings create a flow structure, where the properties are anisotropic (different based on direction). With the stringers oriented parallel to the surface it strengthens the workpiece, especially with respect to fracturing. The stringers act as "crack-arrestors" because the crack will want to propagate through the stringer and not along it.

The disadvantages are:

- Undesirable reactions between the metal and the surrounding atmosphere (scaling or rapid oxidation of the workpiece)
- Less precise tolerances due to thermal contraction and warping from uneven cooling
- Grain structure may vary throughout the metal for various reasons
- Requires a heating unit of some kind such as a gas or diesel furnace or an induction heater, which can be very expensive

== Processes ==
- Rolling
  - Hot rolling
- Hot spinning
- Extrusion
- Forging
- Drawing
- Rotary piercing
