= Continuous casting =

Process for solidifying molten metal

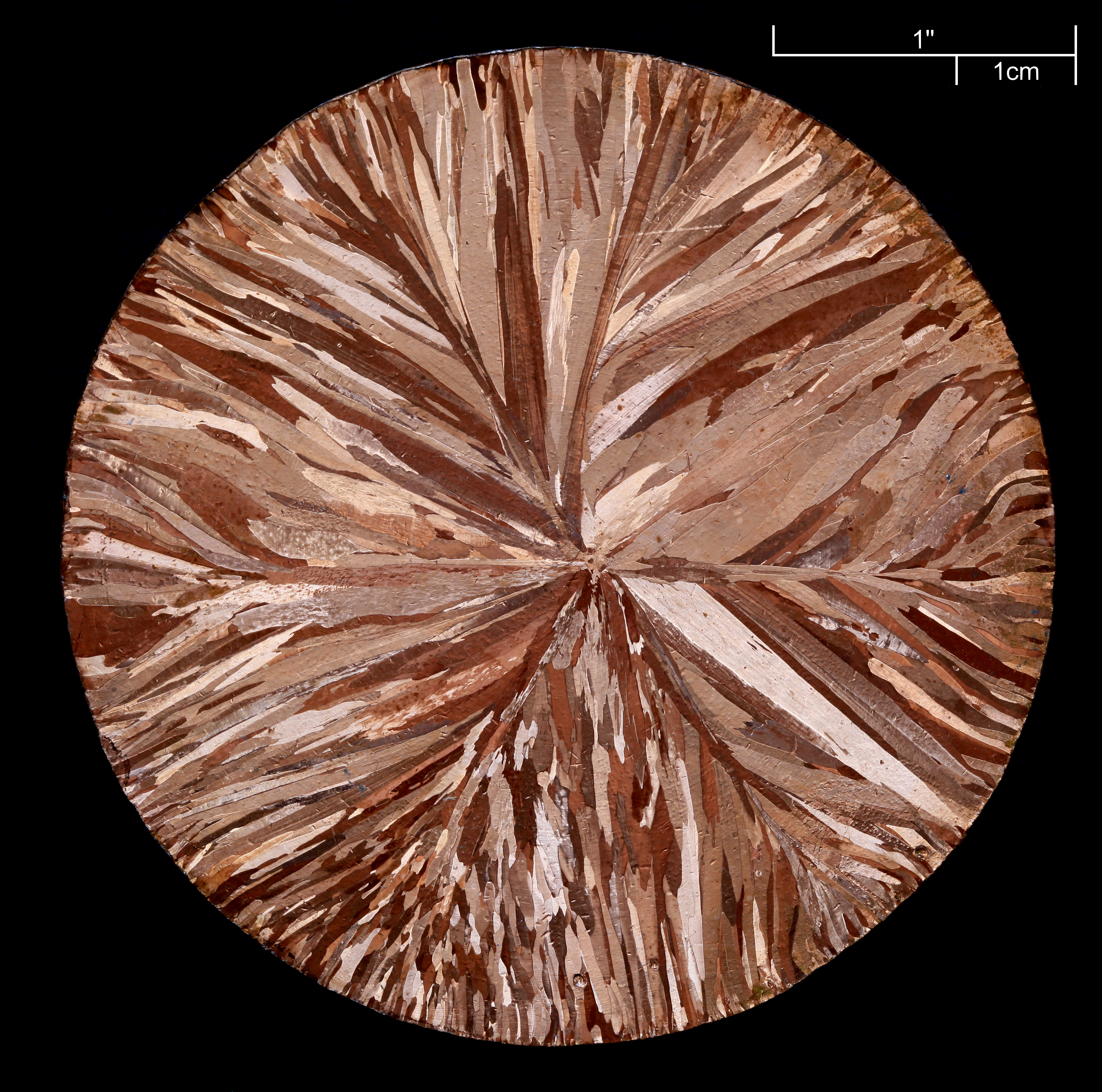
The macrostructure of continuously cast copper (99.95% pure), etched, ∅ ≈ 83 mm.

Continuous casting, also called strand casting, is the process whereby molten metal is solidified into a "semifinished" billet, bloom, or slab for subsequent rolling in the finishing mills. Prior to the introduction of continuous casting in the 1950s, steel was poured into stationary molds to form ingots. Since then, continuous casting has evolved to achieve improved yield, quality, productivity, and cost efficiency. It allows lower-cost production of metal sections with better quality, due to the inherently lower costs of continuous, standardised production of a product, as well as providing increased control over the process through automation. This process is used most frequently to cast steel (in terms of tonnage cast). Aluminium and copper are also continuously cast.

Sir Henry Bessemer, of Bessemer converter fame, received a patent in 1857 for casting metal between two counter-rotating rollers. The basic outline of this system has recently been implemented in the casting of steel strip.

== Equipment and process ==
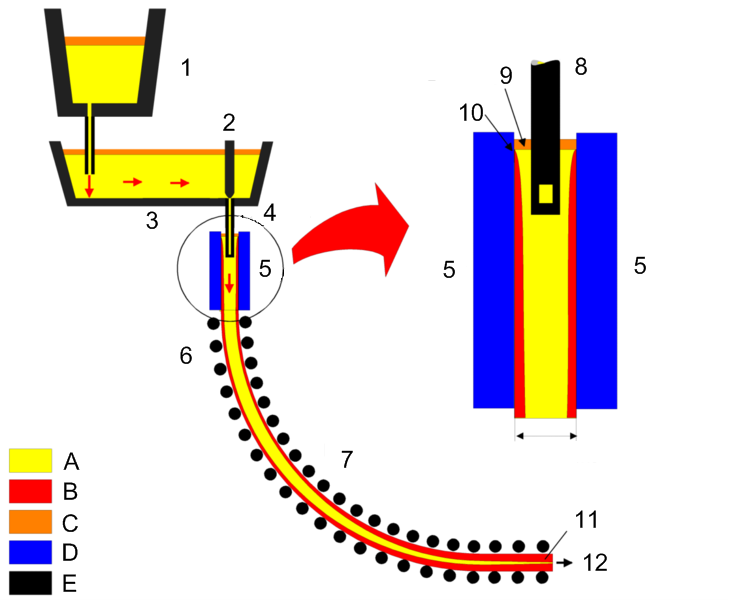
Continuous casting. 1: Ladle. 2: Stopper. 3: Tundish. 4: Submerged entry nozzle 5: Mold. 6: Roll support. 7: Turning zone. 8: Submerged entry nozzle 9: Bath level. 10: Meniscus. 11: Withdrawal unit. 12: Slab. A: Liquid metal. B: Solidified metal. C: Slag. D: Water-cooled copper plates. E: Refractory material.

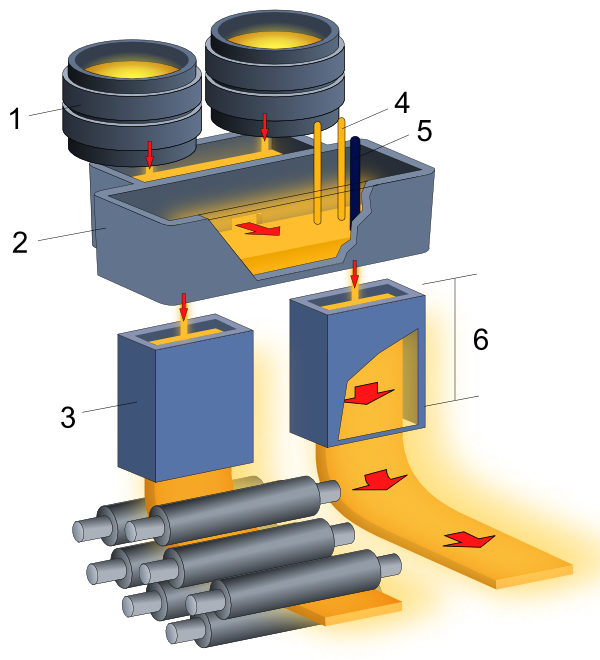
Continuous casting (Tundish and Mold). 1: Ladle. 2: Tundish. 3: Mold. 4: Plasma torch. 5: Stopper. 6: Straight zone.

=== Steel ===
Molten metal is tapped into the ladle from furnaces. After undergoing any ladle treatments, such as alloying and degassing, and arriving at the correct temperature, the ladle is transported to the top of the casting machine. Usually the ladle sits in a slot on a rotating turret at the casting machine. One ladle is in the "on-cast" position (feeding the casting machine) while the other is made ready in the "off-cast" position, and is switched to the casting position when the first ladle is empty.

From the ladle, the hot metal is transferred via a refractory shroud (pipe) to a holding bath called a tundish. The tundish allows a reservoir of metal to feed the casting machine while ladles are switched, thus acting as a buffer of hot metal, as well as smoothing out flow, regulating metal feed to the molds and cleaning the metal (see below).

Usually a disposable working lining refractory known as "tundish boards" is used.

Metal is drained from the tundish through another shroud into the top of an open-base copper mold. The depth of the mold can range from 0.5 to 2 metres (20 to 79 in), depending on the casting speed and section size. The mold is water-cooled to solidify the hot metal directly in contact with it; this is the primary cooling process. It also oscillates vertically (or in a near-vertical curved path) to prevent the metal sticking to the mold walls. A lubricant (either powders that melt on contact with the metal, or liquids) is added to the metal in the mold to prevent sticking, and to trap any slag particles—including oxide particles or scale—that may be present in the metal and bring them to the top of the pool to form a floating layer of slag. The shroud is set so the hot metal exits it below the surface of the slag layer in the mold and is thus called a submerged entry nozzle (SEN). In some cases, shrouds may not be used between tundish and mold (open-pour casting); in this case, interchangeable metering nozzles in the base of the tundish direct the metal into the molds. Some continuous casting layouts feed several molds from the same tundish.

In the mold, a thin shell of metal next to the mold walls solidifies before the center, and then the molded metal, now called a strand, exits the base of the mold into a spray chamber. The bulk of the metal within the walls of the strand is still molten. The strand is immediately supported by closely spaced, water-cooled rollers which support the walls of the strand against the ferrostatic pressure (compare hydrostatic pressure) of the still-solidifying liquid within the strand. To increase the rate of solidification, the strand is sprayed with large amounts of water as it passes through the spray-chamber; this is the secondary cooling process. Final solidification of the strand may take place after the strand has exited the spray-chamber.

It is here that the design of continuous casting machines may vary. This describes a "curved-apron" casting machine; vertical configurations are also used. In a curved-apron casting machine, the strand exits the mold vertically (or on a near-vertical curved path), and as it travels through the spray-chamber, the rollers gradually curve the strand towards the horizontal. In a vertical casting machine, the strand stays vertical as it passes through the spray-chamber. Molds in a curved apron casting machine can be straight or curved, depending on the basic design of the machine.

In a true horizontal casting machine, the mold axis is horizontal and the flow of steel is horizontal from liquid to thin shell to solid (no bending). In this type of machine, either strand or mold oscillation is used to prevent sticking in the mold.

After exiting the spray-chamber, the strand passes through straightening rolls (if cast on other than a vertical machine) and withdrawal rolls. There may be a hot-rolling stand after withdrawal to take advantage of the metal's hot condition to pre-shape the final strand. Finally, the strand is cut into predetermined lengths by mechanical shears or by travelling oxyacetylene torches, is marked for identification, and is taken either to a stockpile or to the next forming process.

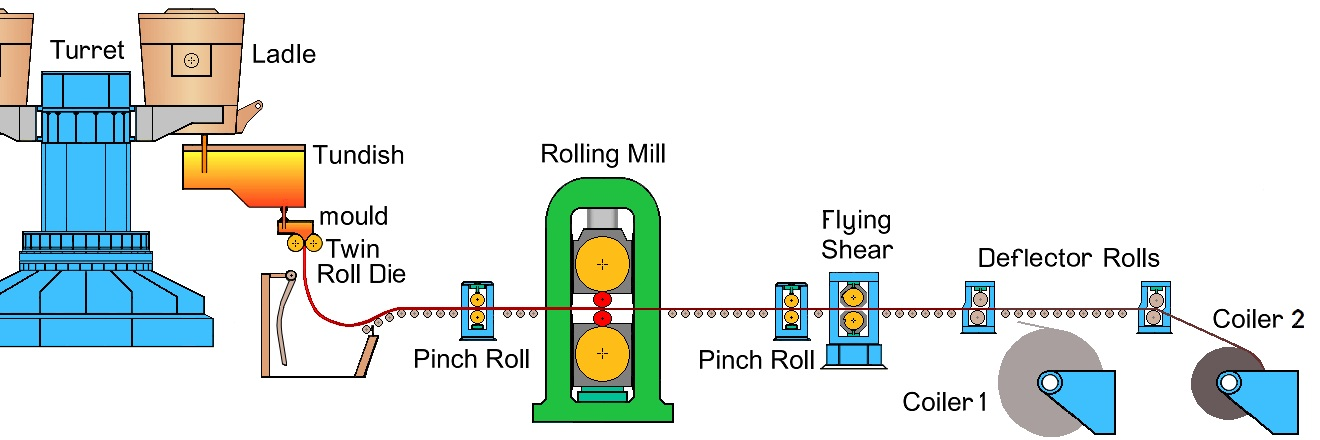
Sketch of thin-strip casting plant.

In many cases, the strand may continue through additional rollers and other mechanisms which may flatten, roll, or extrude the metal into its final shape.

Developments since the mid 1980s reduced the thicknesses that can be cast, initially to transfer bars of ~50mm thickness, also called thin slabs, and then more recently down to thin strip castings of 2mm thickness.

=== Casting machines for aluminium and copper ===
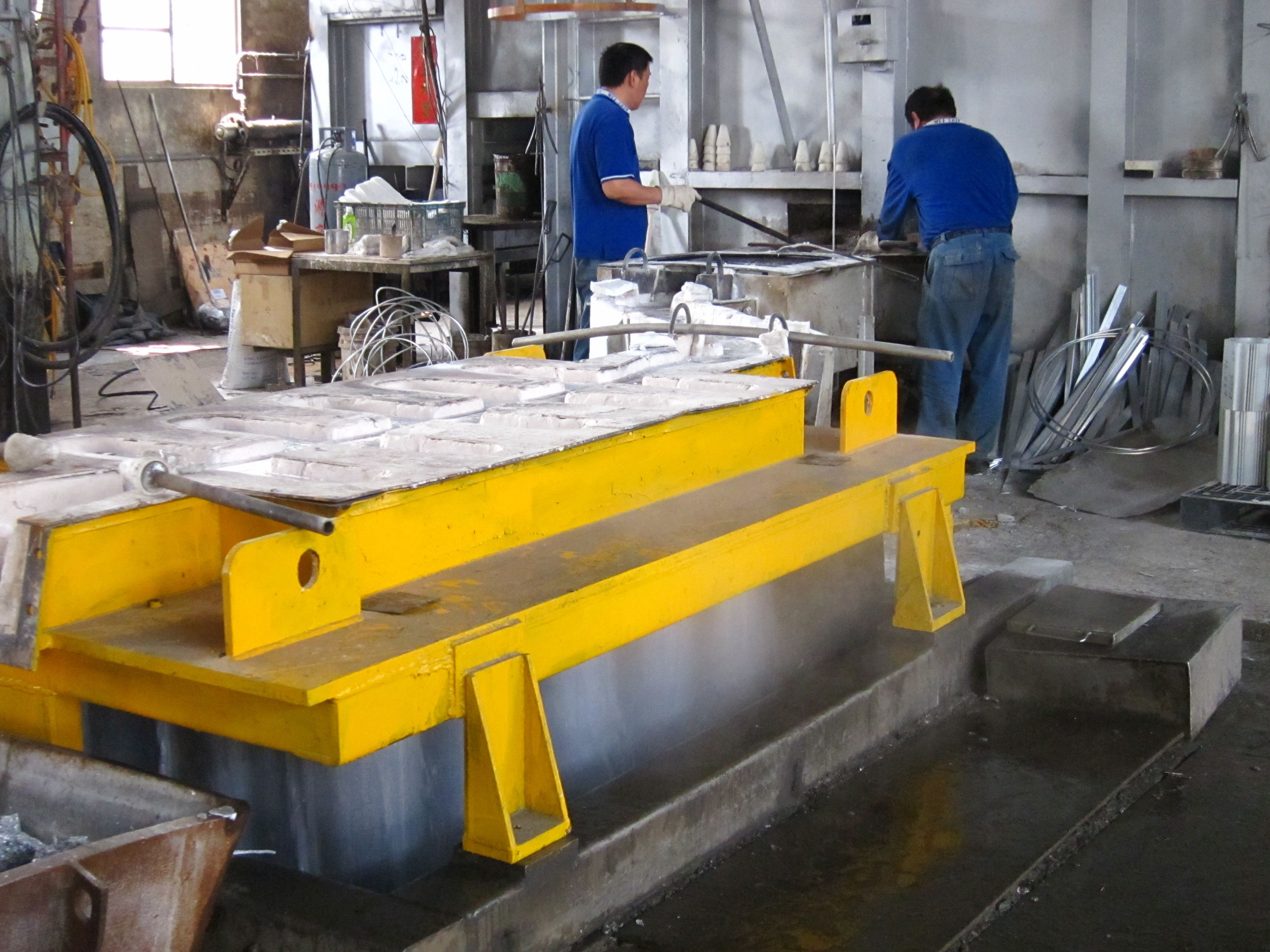
Continuous hot vertical casting in process (aluminum)

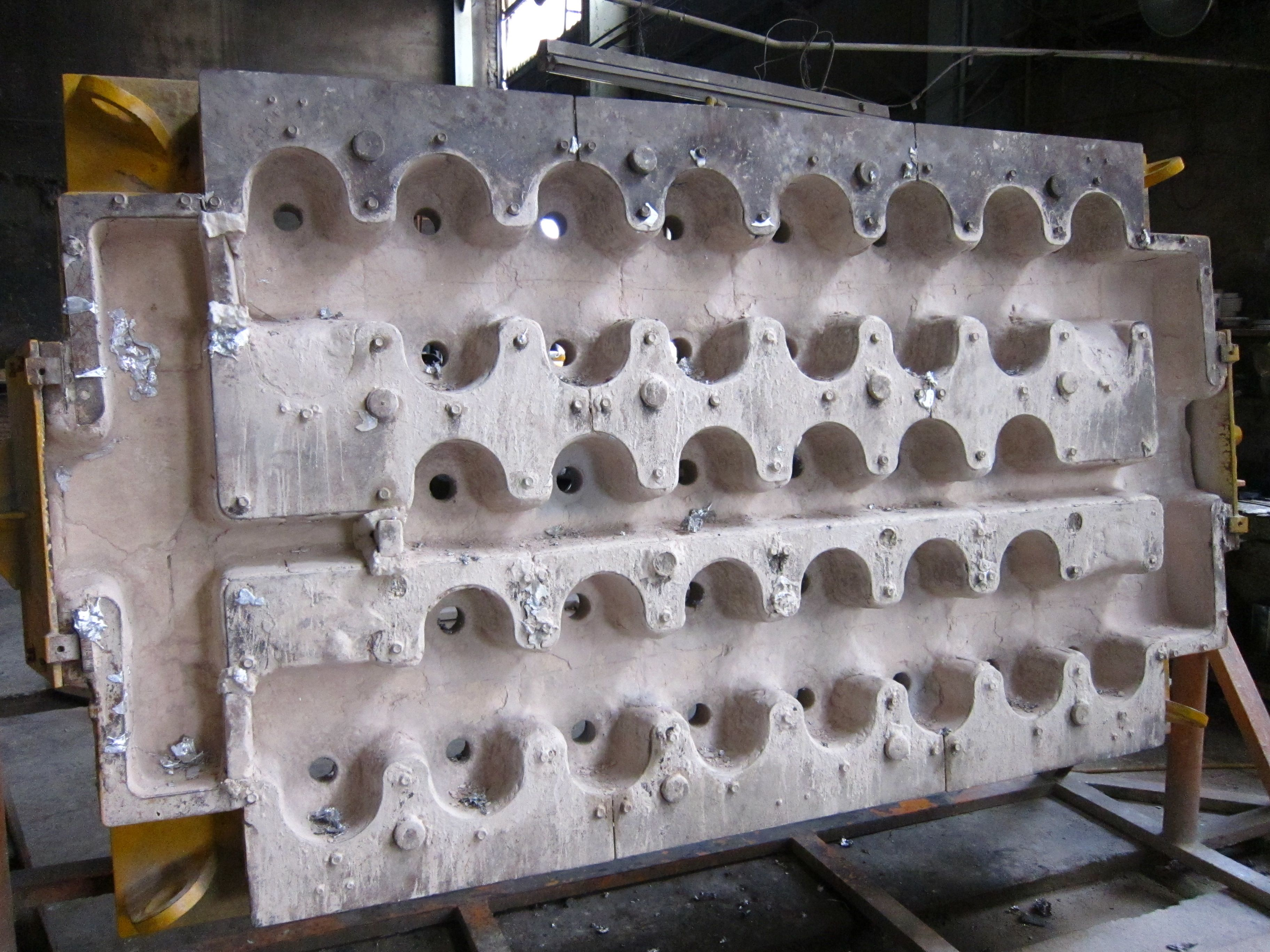
Molten aluminum pours into this casting die (top view of die)

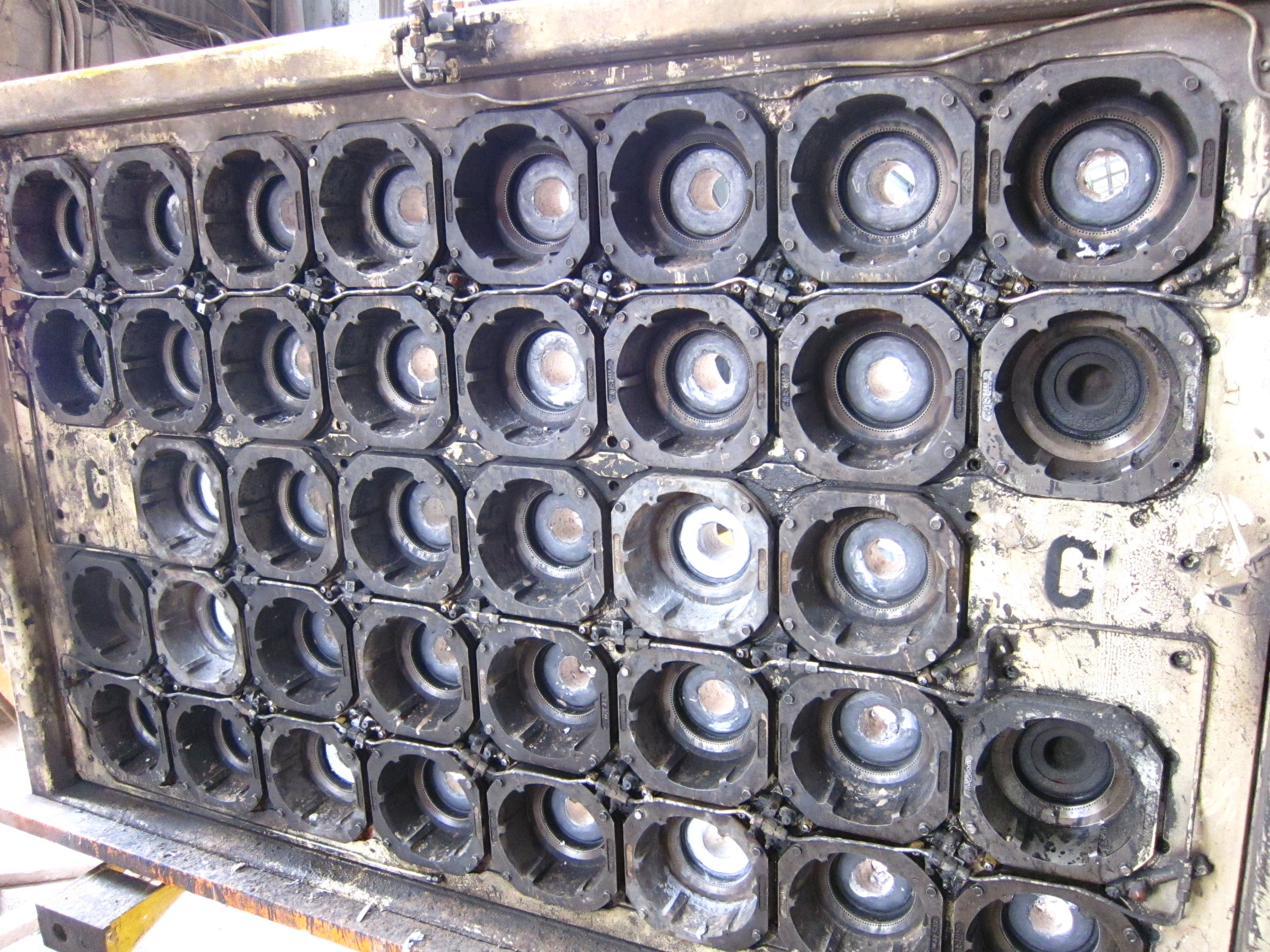
Bottom end of casting die

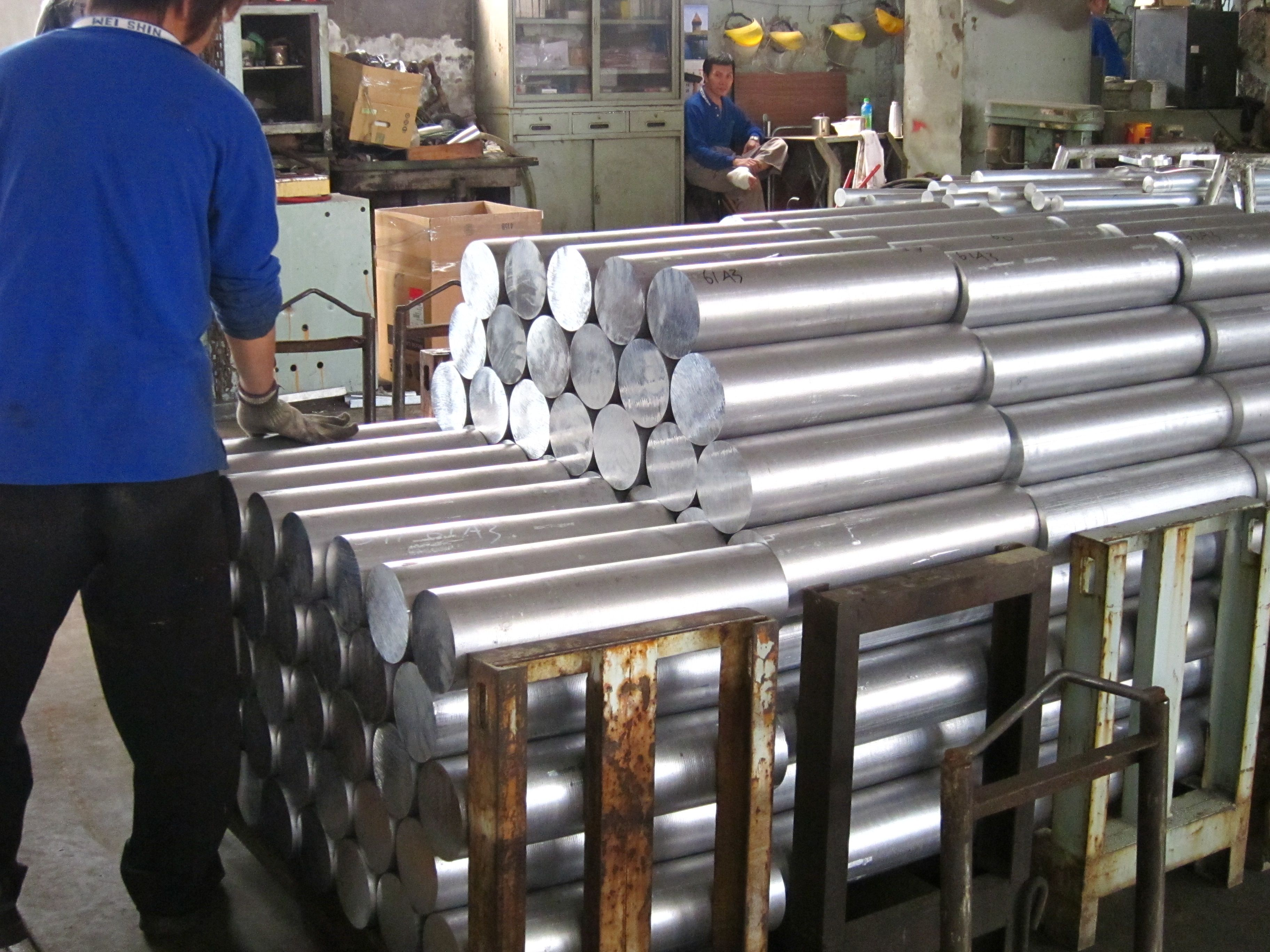
The resulting aluminum blanks (after cutting to size)

Aluminium and copper can be cast horizontally and can be more easily cast into near net shape, especially strip, due to their lower melting temperatures.

=== Range of continuously cast sections ===
- Casting machines are designated to be billet, bloom, slab, or strip casters.
- Slab casters tend to cast sections that are much wider than thick:
  - Conventional slabs lie in the range 100–1600 mm wide by 180–250 mm thick and up to 12 m long with conventional casting speeds of up to 1.4 m/minute; however, slab widths and casting speeds are currently increasing.
  - Wider slabs are available up to 3250×150 mm.
  - Thick slabs are available up to 2200×450 mm at a specific steel facility, generically ranging typically from 200mm to 300mm.
  - Thin slabs (low-carbon steel): 1680×50 mm at a specific facility, generically ranging from 40mm to 110mm thick depending on an individual machine's design.
- Conventional bloom casters cast sections above 200×200 mm. The bloom length can vary from 4 to 10 m.
- Billet casters cast smaller section sizes, such as below 200 mm square, with lengths up to 12 m long. Cast speeds can reach up to 4 m/minute.
- Rounds: either 500 mm or 140 mm in diameter.
- Conventional beam blanks: look similar to I-beams in cross-section; 1048×450 mm or 438×381 mm overall.
- Near net shape beam blanks: 850×250 mm overall.
- Strip: 2–5 mm thick by 760–1330 mm wide.

== Startup and control of the process ==
Starting a continuous casting machine involves placing a dummy bar (essentially a curved metal beam) up through the spray chamber to close off the base of the mold. Metal is poured into the mold and withdrawn with the dummy bar once it solidifies. It is extremely important that the metal supply afterwards be guaranteed to avoid unnecessary shutdowns and restarts, known as turnarounds. Each time the caster stops and restarts, a new tundish is required, as any uncast metal in the tundish cannot be drained and instead freezes into a "skull". Avoiding turnarounds requires the melt shop, including ladle furnaces (if any), to keep tight control on the temperature of the metal, which can vary dramatically with alloying additions, slag cover, deslagging, and the preheating of the ladle before it accepts metal, among other parameters. However, the cast rate may be lowered by reducing the amount of metal in the tundish (although this can increase wear on the tundish), or if the caster has multiple strands, one or more strands may be shut down to accommodate upstream delays. Turnarounds may be scheduled into a production sequence if the tundish temperature becomes too high after a certain number of heats or the service lifetime of a non-replaceable component (such as the submerged entry nozzle in a thin-slab casting machine) is reached.

Many continuous-casting operations are now fully computer-controlled. Several electromagnetic, thermal, or radiation sensors at the ladle shroud, tundish, and mold sense the metal level or weight, flow rate, and temperature of the hot metal, and the programmable logic controller (PLC) can set the rate of strand withdrawal via speed control of the withdrawal rolls. The flow of metal into the molds can be controlled via three methods:

- By stopper rods that descend through the tundish
- By slide gates at the top of the mold shrouds
- If the metal is open-poured, then the metal flow into the molds is controlled solely by the internal diameter of the metering nozzles. These nozzles are usually interchangeable.

Overall casting speed can be adjusted by altering the amount of metal in the tundish, via the ladle slide gate. The PLC can also set the mold oscillation rate and the rate of mold powder feed, as well as the flow of water in the cooling sprays within the strand. Computer control also allows vital casting data to be transmitted to other manufacturing centres (particularly the steelmaking furnaces), allowing their work rates to be adjusted to avoid "overflow" or "underrun" of product.

== Problems ==
=== Contamination by oxygen ===
While the large amount of automation helps produce castings with no shrinkage and little segregation, continuous casting is of no use if the metal is not clean beforehand, or becomes "dirty" during the casting process. One of the main methods through which hot metal may become dirty is by oxidation, which occurs rapidly at molten-metal temperatures (up to 1700 °C for steel); inclusions of gas, slag, or undissolved alloys may also be present. To prevent oxidation, the metal is isolated from the atmosphere as much as possible. To achieve this, exposed liquid-metal surfaces are covered – by the shrouds, or in the case of the ladle, tundish, and mold, by synthetic slag. In the tundish, any inclusions that are less dense than the liquid metal – gas bubbles, other slag or oxides, or undissolved alloys – may also float to the surface and be trapped in the slag layer. While the tundish and mold fill for the first time at the start of a casting run, the liquid is badly contaminated with oxygen, and the first items produced are typically quarantined or diverted to customers who do not require top-quality material.

Upcasting solves this problem by forming a continuous product from a metal (e.g. copper or silver) seed (e.g. metal rod).

=== Breakouts ===
A major problem that may occur in continuous casting is breakout of the liquid metal: for whatever reason, the solid shell of the strand breaks and allows the still-molten metal contained within to spill out and foul the machine. In most industrial environments, this event is very costly as it leads to a shutdown of the strand and typically requires an extended turnaround involving removal of the spilled material from within the strand equipment or replacement of damaged machinery. A breakout is usually due to the shell wall being too thin to support the liquid column above it, a condition which has several root causes often related to heat management. Improper cooling-water flow to the mold or the strand cooling sprays may lead to inadequate heat removal from the solidifying metal, causing the solid shell to thicken too slowly. If the metal withdrawal rate is too fast, then the shell may not have time to solidify to the required thickness even with enhanced cooling sprays. Similarly, the incoming liquid metal may be too hot, and the final solidification may occur further down the strand at a later point than expected; if this point is below the straightening rolls, then the shell may break from stresses applied during straightening. A breakout can also occur as a result of physical irregularities or damage to the shell occurring within the mold during the initial seconds of solidification. Excessive turbulence within the mold may cause an irregular shell pattern that grows abnormally, or it may entrap slag droplets within the shell, which reduces the wall strength. A common occurrence is for the shell to stick to the mold's surface and tear; modern instrumented molds and computer control systems typically detect this and slow the caster down temporarily to let the wall refreeze and heal while it is still supported in the mold. Should the tear occur near the exit of the mold or be of unexpected severity, the shell may still fail in a breakout once it emerges from the mold wall. If the incoming metal is severely overheated, then it may be preferable to stop the caster than to risk a breakout. Additionally, lead contamination of the metal (caused by counterweights or lead-acid batteries in the initial steel charge) can form a thin film between the mold wall and the steel, inhibiting heat removal and shell growth and increasing the risk of breakouts.

=== Other considerations ===
Another problem that may occur is a carbon boil – oxygen dissolved in the steel reacts with also-present carbon to generate bubbles of carbon monoxide. As the term boil suggests, this reaction is extremely fast and violent, generating large amounts of hot gas, and is especially dangerous if it occurs in the confined spaces of a casting machine. Oxygen can be removed by "killing" it through the addition of silicon or aluminium to the steel, which reacts to form silicon oxide (silica) or aluminium oxide (alumina). However, too much alumina in the steel will clog the casting nozzles and cause the steel to "choke off".

Computational fluid dynamics and other fluid-flow techniques are being used extensively in the design of new continuous-casting operations, especially in the tundish, to ensure that inclusions and turbulence are removed from the hot metal, yet ensure that all the metal reaches the mold before it cools too much. Slight adjustments to the flow conditions within the tundish or the mold can mean the difference between high and low rejection rates of the product.

== Starter bar ==
The starter bar, also called a dummy bar, has a free-end portion which is flexible for storage and a substantially rigid portion at the end which plugs the mold. The starter bar is constructed in discrete blocks secured to one side of a planar spine provided in segments and arranged end-to-end. Adjustable spacers in the form of tapered blocks are placed between the blocks of the bar to allow the starter bar to be self-supporting in a curved configuration corresponding to the casting path. A more flexible spine in the end portion of the starter bar allows the starter bar to be curved to a tighter radius than that of the casting path while the blocks fan out in an unsupported configuration. A storage ramp is provided to support the flexible end in the stored position. Before a cast is started, the starter bars are fed through the caster (in reverse direction of casting) using hydraulic actuators. Once fed all the way to the bottom of the mold, the process of packing the mold can continue to ensure a smooth startup.

== Direct strip casting ==
Direct strip casting is a continuous casting process for producing metallic sheet directly from the molten state that minimizes the need for substantial secondary processing. For low-carbon sheet steels, this is a relatively new process which has only achieved commercial success since the early 2000s.

== Twin-belt continuous casting ==
Twin-belt continuous casting is a continuous casting process that produces high-volume continuous metal bar or strip of constant rectangular cross section. Twin-belt continuous casting employs a moving mold consisting of parallel carbon-steel belts held in tension as top and bottom casting surfaces. Chains of rectangular steel or copper blocks moving with the belts and spaced according to the desired cast width form the sides of the mold.

Molten metal is introduced into the twin-belt continuous casting machine from a tundish through a nozzle placed between the casting belts. The metal is cooled by direct contact with the belts, which are in turn cooled by high-pressure recirculating water. Various coatings can be applied to the belt casting surfaces to provide required mold-interface characteristics and prevent adhesion.

The cast metal from the twin-belt continuous casting machine is synchronized with, and directly fed into, a hot-rolling mill. Combining the casting and rolling operations can result in significant energy and cost savings over other casting processes that incorporate intermediate cast and reheat steps.

Metals cast on twin-belt continuous casting machines: Copper (bar, strip, anode), aluminum (strip), zinc (strip), lead (strip)

Production rates and speeds: Twin-belt continuous casting rates range up to 60 tons per hour at speeds up to 14 meters per minute.

Twin-belt continuous casting is a near-net-shape casting process, which significantly reduces the need for secondary rolling or forming operations. For example, when casting copper anode plate, the cast slab is not rolled but rather sheared directly into distinct anode plates.

The cooling belts are typically made of low-carbon steel and are held under tension within the casting machine to ensure flatness and accuracy. As a "cold" belt enters the mold region, it is heated in the cast zone and is subject to powerful forces caused by thermal expansion. When casting wide strip, these forces must be controlled to eliminate buckling and reduce thermal distortion of the belt at the mold entrance. These forces can be controlled by preheating the belts before mold entry, or by magnetically stabilizing them once they have entered the mold.

Belt preheating: For wide strip casting, a belt preheating system can be used to bring the belt up to 150 °C or higher immediately before entering the casting mold, reducing the effects of cold framing. Induction heating coils can be used across the width to preheat each belt. In addition to preventing thermal distortion, the high preheat temperature serves to eliminate any moisture present on the belt surface.

Magnetic stabilization: When casting wide strip, the tendency of localized thermal distortion can be resisted by the use of high-strength, magnetic belt back-up support rolls within the mold region. The moving belt is held against the support rolls by magnetized rotating fins maintaining the belt in a flat plane.

Within the twin-belt continuous casting machine, molten metal progressively solidifies on the mold surfaces as it moves through the mold region, with a sump of molten metal present between the solidifying outer surfaces. Belt coatings, texture, and gas-layer modifications are used to fine-tune the heat-transfer rate from the cast metal to the belt. Full-thickness solidification can occur as early as 30% of the way through the mold for thin strip, or up to 2 m beyond the mold exit for large bar where exit water spray cooling and roller support are required.

Closed-pool feeding: When casting certain metals such as aluminum, a fully closed-pool “injection” metal feeding system can be employed. Here, the metal is introduced under slight pressure into the closed mold cavity. Metal flow is controlled by maintaining a preset level in the tundish. The feed snout, or nozzle, is typically made from a ceramic material which is thermally stable and permeable to gases being released from the flowing metal.

Open-pool feeding: When casting other metals, such as copper, zinc, and lead, an open-pool feeding system is often used. In this case, the upper belt pulley is offset downstream from the bottom pulley. Metal flows through an open trough or tundish into a standing pool of molten metal formed at the convergence of the belts. Shrouding gases may be employed to protect against oxidation.

Mold tapering: The twin-belt casting machine differs from other moving-mold casting machines in that all four mold surfaces are independent. This allows the mold surfaces to be tapered to remain in contact with the cast product as it shrinks. The high-velocity cooling water, which is continuously applied to the backside of the belt, impinges on the belt and creates a force on the belt. This force acts to press the belt against the surface of the strip or slab as it shrinks, keeping the belt in close contact with the cast product throughout the mold. Each side of the mold is formed by an endless chain of dam blocks, which are held against the cast strip by adjustable spring-loaded guides.

Molten-metal level control: To accommodate high casting speeds and maintain as high a pool level as possible, non-contact electromagnetic metal-level indicators can be used to sense the pool level in the casting machine.

Aluminum or copper strip casting: Commercial twin-belt continuous strip casting machines are capable of producing as-cast dimensions from 10–35 mm thick, and up to 2035 mm wide. After being directly fed into a hot-rolling mill, the as-cast strip is typically rolled down to 1–3 mm thickness.

Copper bar casting: As-cast dimensions range from 35–75 mm thick, and from 50–150 mm wide. After being directly fed into a hot rolling mill, the as-cast bar is typically rolled into 8 mm diameter rod to be used for wire drawing.

Copper anode casting: Special dam blocks which contain anode lug molds and a traveling hydraulic shear are added to the twin-belt casting machine to continuously cast net-shape copper anodes. Anode width of approximately 1 meter (excluding lugs) and thicknesses from 16 mm to 45 mm are achievable. The primary advantage of this process is uniformity of the as-cast anode in terms of size and surface quality. Anodes cast using this process do not require additional preparation after casting.

Mold length:The mold length ranges from approximately 2000 mm for strip casting machines up to 3700 mm for copper bar casting machines.
