= Ironing (metalworking) =

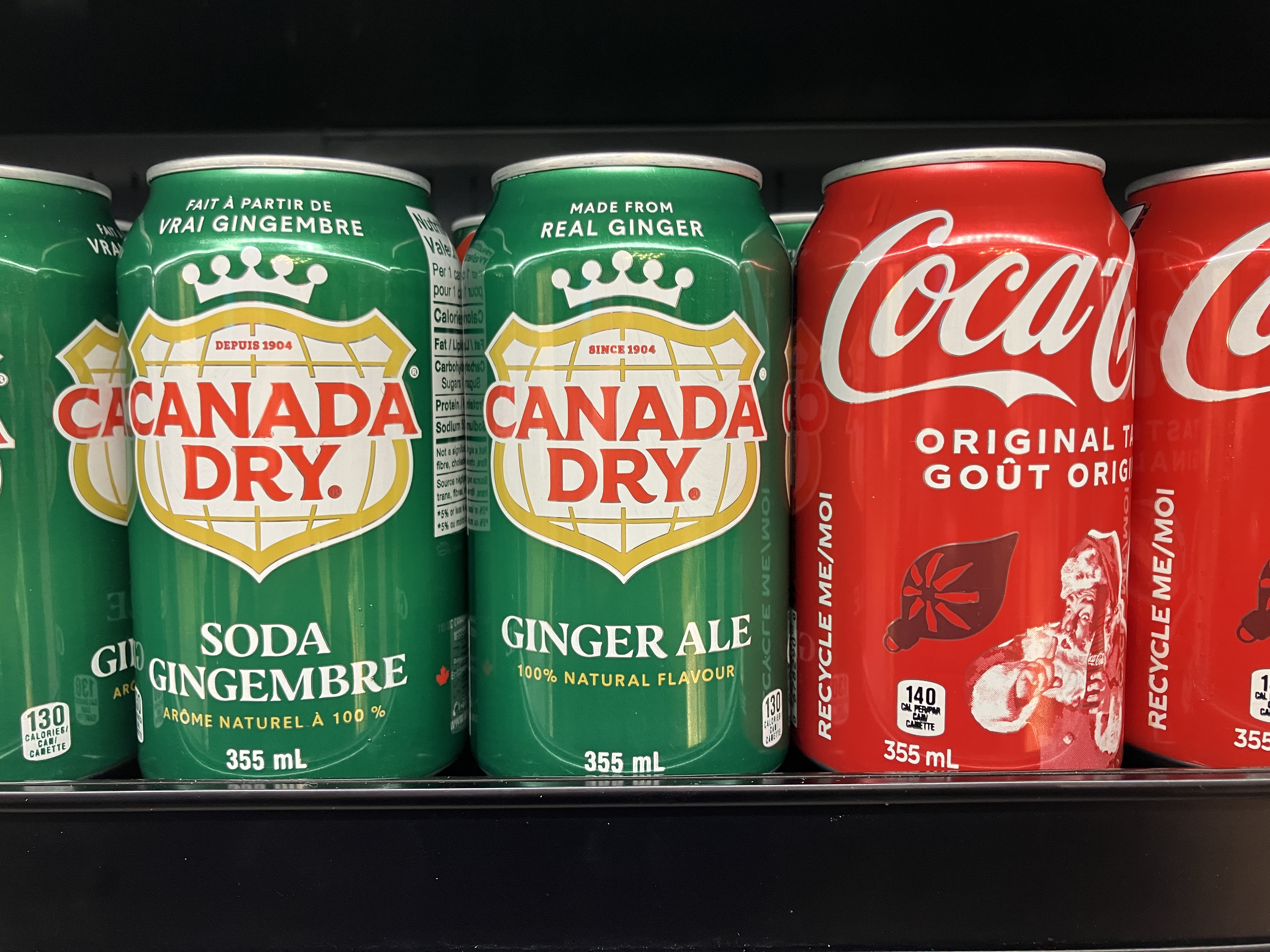
Soda cans, a common example of ironing

Ironing is a sheet metal forming process that uniformly thins the workpiece in a specific area. This is not to be mistaken with fabric ironing. This process involves using force to evenly flatten a piece of sheet metal into a uniform shape. This could also be the root of the process name, as it uses pressure to flatten the material much like fabric ironing.

== Process ==
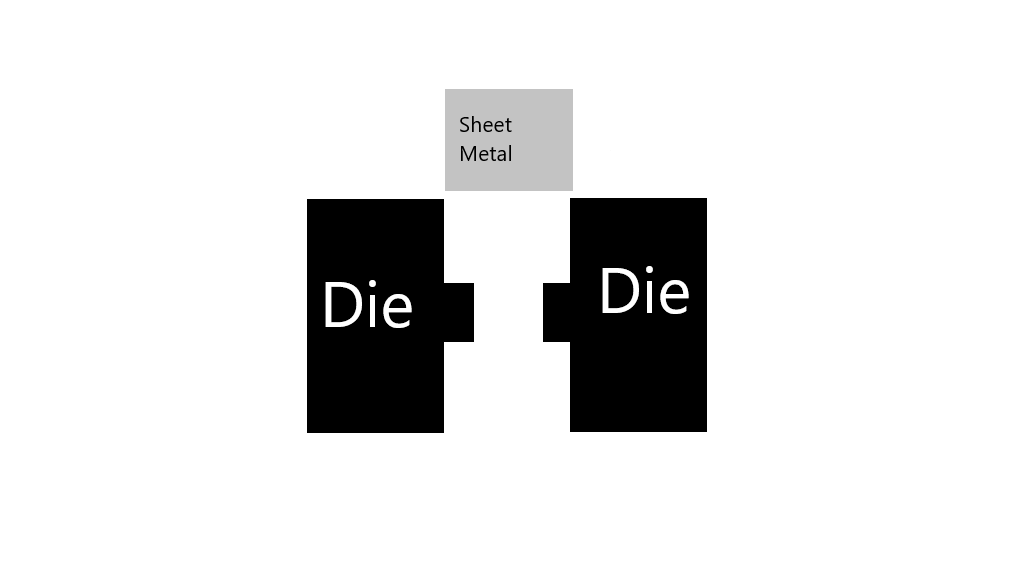
Metal and dies before process

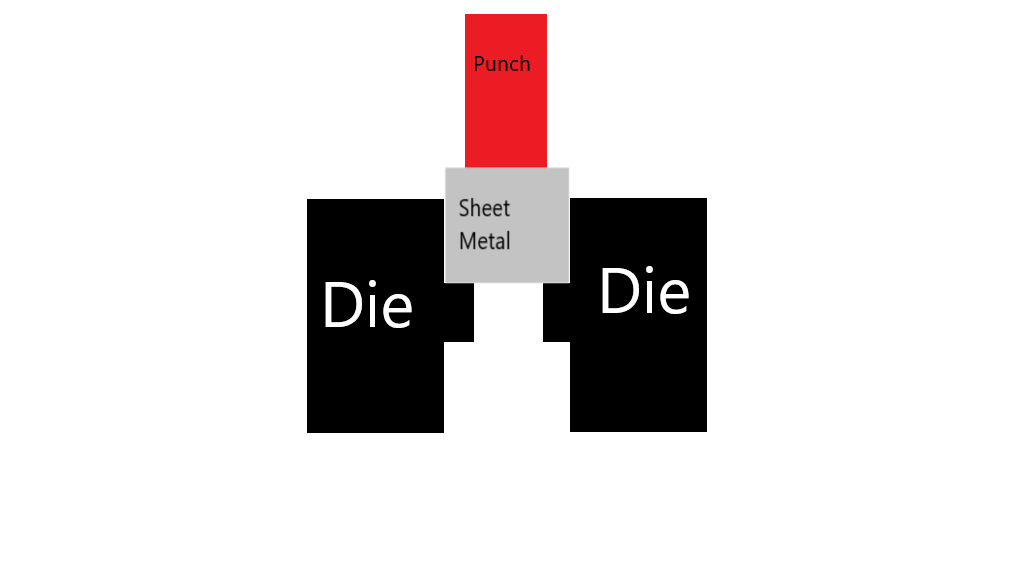
Punch is introduced, begins pushing metal against the die

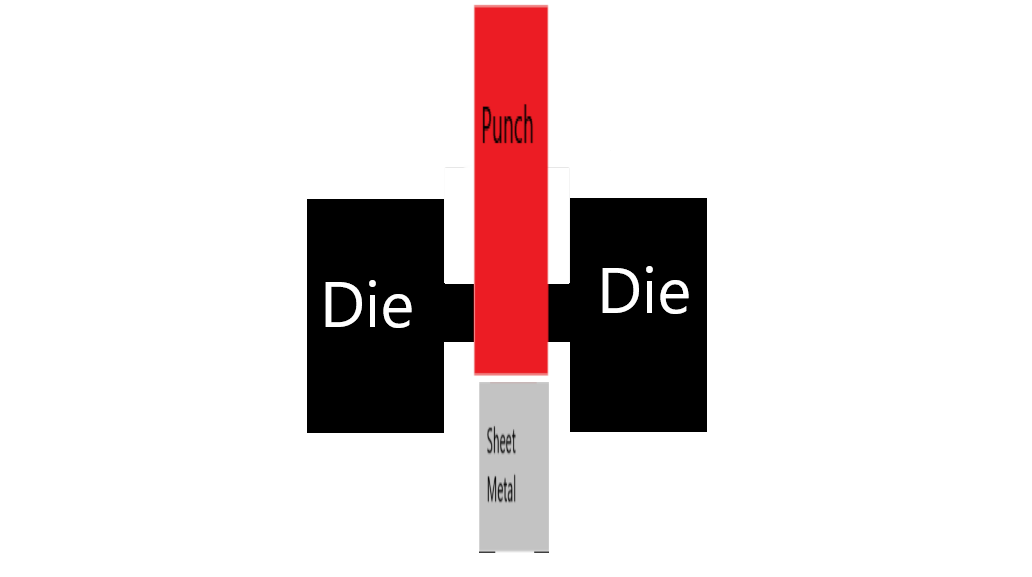
After the process is finished, the metal is now flattened and pressed down to the desired size, also making it longer.

For the process, the piece of metal is placed against a tool that presses it forward, called a "punch". The punch pushes the metal through a die, or more commonly 2 dies, which are designed to push against the metal until it reaches a desired flatness. This also results in the piece being made longer, as the process spreads the metal out more rather than removing any of it.

Ironing is commonly used alongside the process of deep drawing, as the process of deep drawing is very similar in how it uses pressure, and deep drawing can often lead to irregularities in uniformity. Described briefly, deep drawing involves pushing down on a piece of metal (usually round) into dies to result in a deeper piece of metal that is mostly hollow.

== Applications ==
Most uses of ironing are brought in following a deep draw process to finish a piece. The most commonly known use of ironing is in the production of drink cans, as the process helps make uniform cans all around, which is useful for identical appearance and packaging. Deep drawing and ironing are also heavily used in the automotive industry for making parts. One such example is casing for a car battery.
