= Tube beading =

Tube beading is a metal forming process that forms a bead on the end of a tube. Tube beads can be used to help hold a hose on the end of a tube or to strengthen the end of the tube. There are two forming processes: internal roll forming and ram forming.

== Internal roll forming ==
Internal roll forming is generally slower than ram forming but it holds tight tolerances. Serrated clamp jaws are used to hold the tube while radial pressure is applied by an internal roller to form the bead.

== Ram forming ==
Ram forming is quicker and usually preferred when speed of production is a concern. The automotive industry usually uses this process over internal roll-forming. A clamp is used to hold the tube, the tube is expanded to desired diameter by an expansion punch, and then another punch is used to reduce the tube back to pilot diameter. Multiple beads are possible using this process.
