= Structural shape rolling =

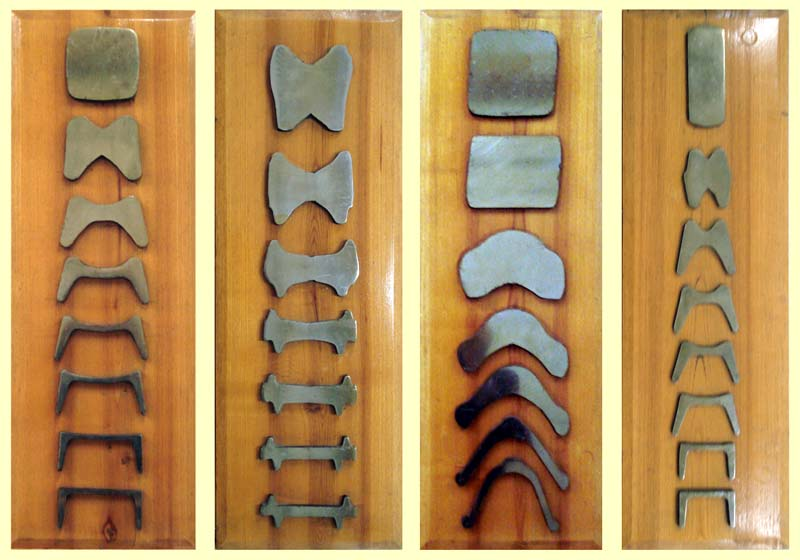
Cross-sections of continuously rolled structural shapes, showing the change induced by each rolling mill.

Structural shape rolling, also known as shape rolling and profile rolling, is the rolling and roll forming of structural shapes by passing them through a rolling mill to bend or deform the workpiece to a desired shape while maintaining a constant cross-section. Structural shapes that can be made with this metal forming process include I-beams, H-beams, T-beams, U-beams, angle iron, channels, bar stock, and railroad rails. The most commonly rolled material is structural steel, including carbon steel and stainless steel. Other metals, plastic, paper, and glass can also be rolled. Common applications include railroads, bridges, roller coasters, art, and architectural applications.

It is a cost-effective way of bending these materials because the process requires less set-up time and uses pre-made dies that are changed according to the shape and dimension of the workpiece. This process can roll workpieces into full circles.

== Process ==
Structural shape rolling uses profile rolling techniques where the workpiece is passed through a series of flatteners (of larger magnitude than most common rolling devices) that match the workpieces' cross-section. The most common method uses 3 rollers; the bending is controlled by varying the distance between the rollers.

Structural shapes can be rolled in different ways such as the “easy-way”, the “hard-way”, heel in/out, ball in/out, leg in/out, stem in/out, and off axis. The hard-way would be bending the workpiece in the orientation where its moment of inertia is the greatest. The easy-way is bending the workpiece along the axis with the smallest moment of inertia. For example, a piece of angle iron rolled the easy-way would be rolled along one of its flanges, while the hard-way would be along the angle itself.
