= Inline skate frame =

Structure connecting boot to wheels

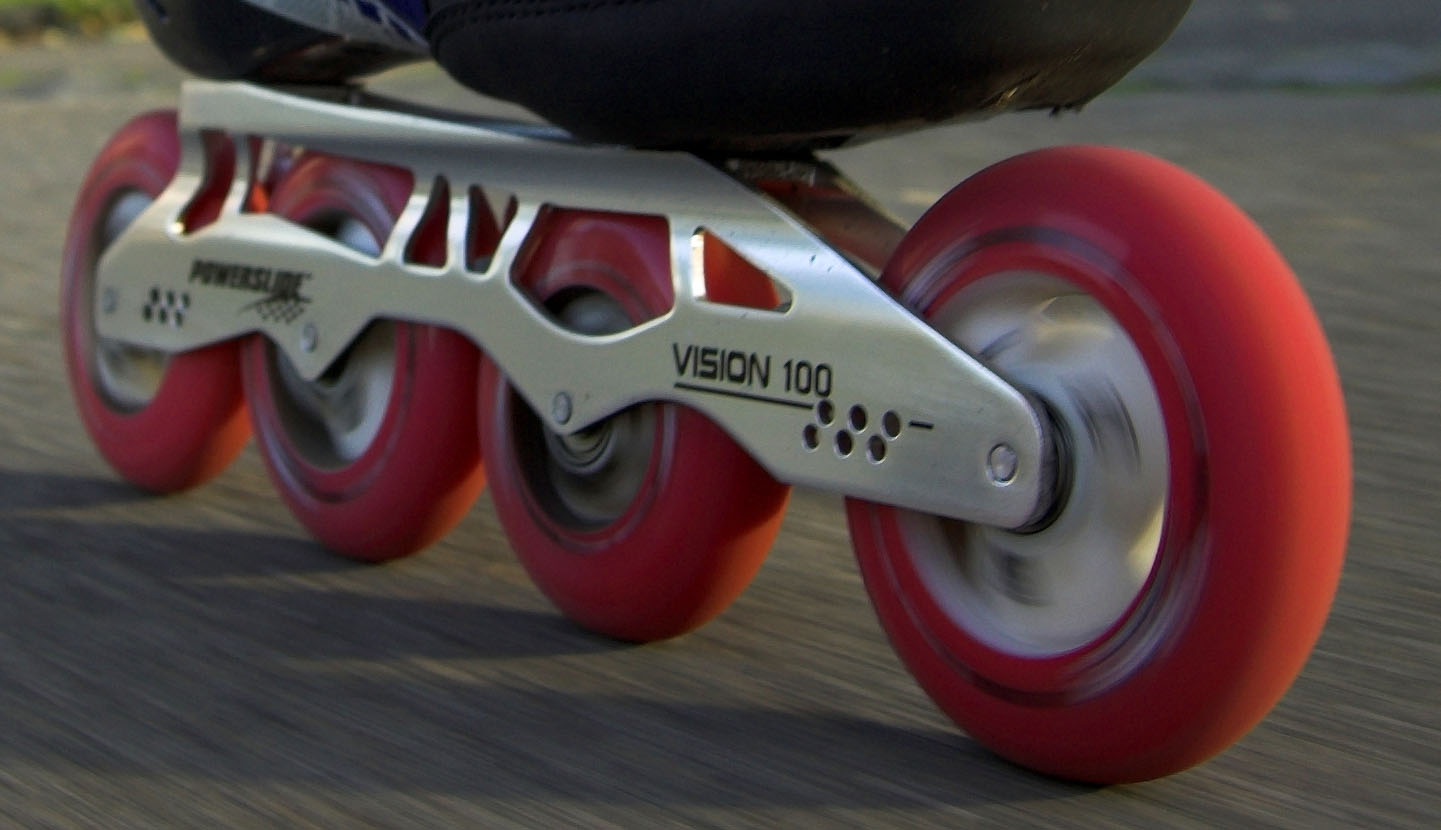
Frame and wheels

An inline skate frame, sometimes referred to as the chassis of an inline skate in certain disciplines such as hockey, serves as the structural link between the boot and the wheels. It connects to the ground through the wheels mounted on it, and to the skater's foot through the sole of the boot.

== Dimensions ==
Frame length, also known as wheelbase, refers to the distance between the centers of the first and last wheel axles. Several factors influence the choice of frame length. The number and size of wheels determine the minimum wheelbase required for a given wheel setup. In disciplines like hockey and slalom, skaters use short frames with closely packed wheels to enhance maneuverability and enable fluid footwork. In contrast, speed skating relies on longer frames, which space out the wheels to provide greater stability at high speeds. Ideally, frame length should be proportionate to the skater's boot size for optimal control, stability, and safety. However, some skates use a one-size-fits-all frame across multiple boot sizes, which can compromise performance.

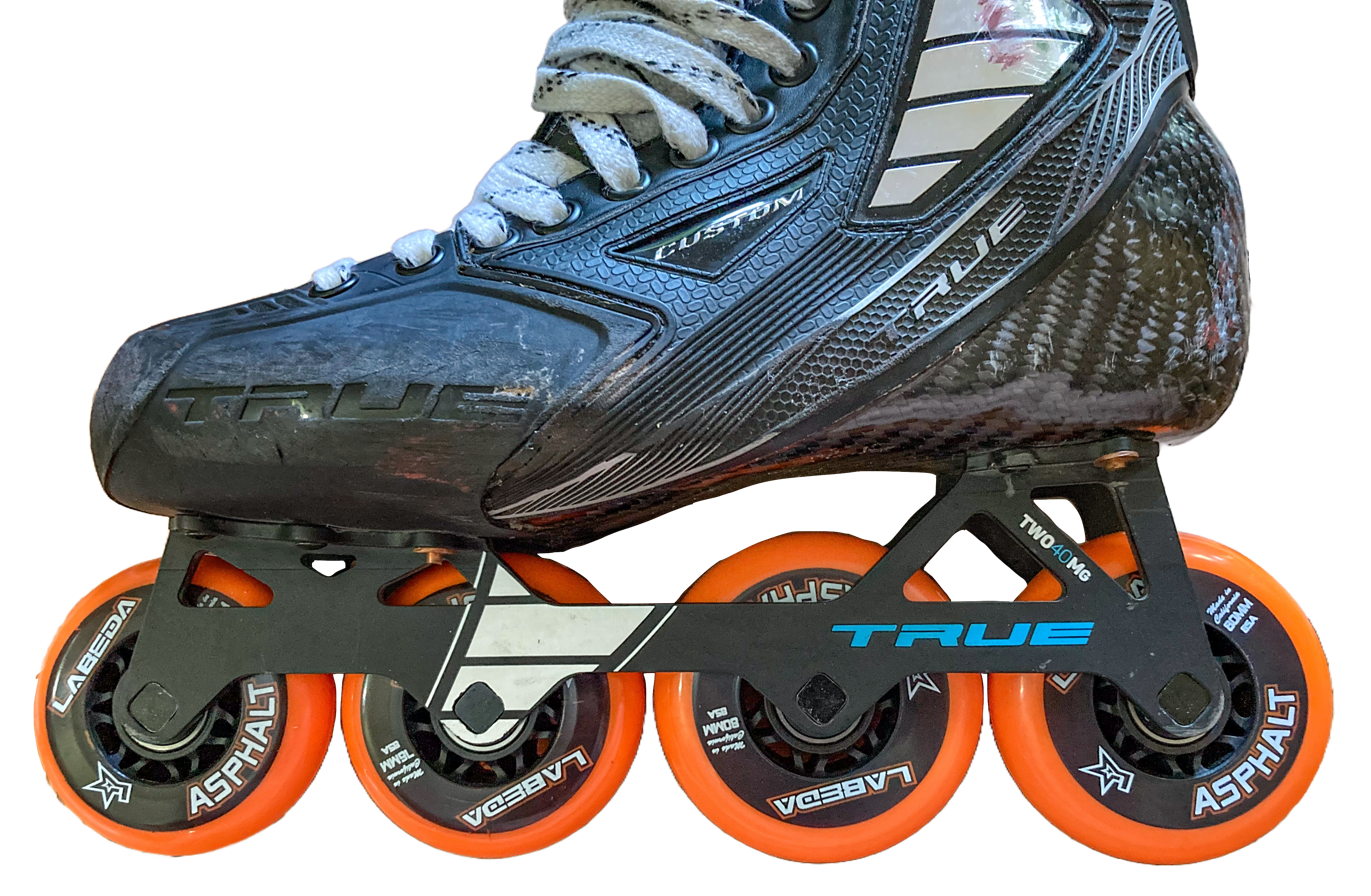
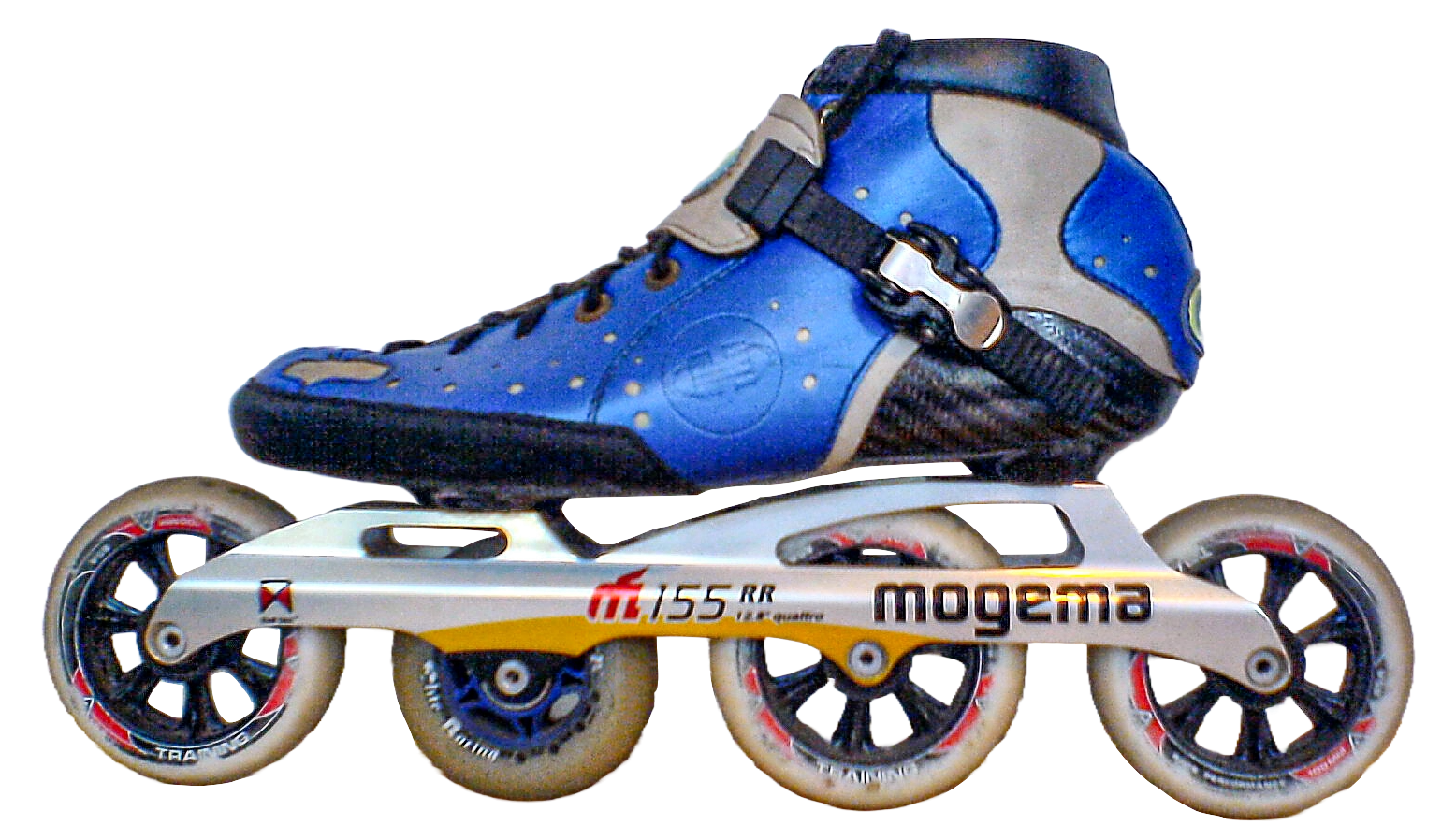
Sole close to front wheels (left) vs. further raised (right)

Frame height, deck height, and ride height are related but loosely defined terms in inline skating. All three describe how low a boot can be positioned relative to the ground in a given setup, considering the number and size of the wheels. Ideally, a skater wants the boot as close to the ground as possible, while allowing enough clearance between the sole and the wheel tops for free rotation. For example, with four 80 mm wheels in a flat setup, the boot should ideally sit just above 80 mm from the ground. A lower center of gravity enhances control and stability. However, factors like frame thickness, mounting platforms, bolts, and other design elements often raise the boot higher than desired.

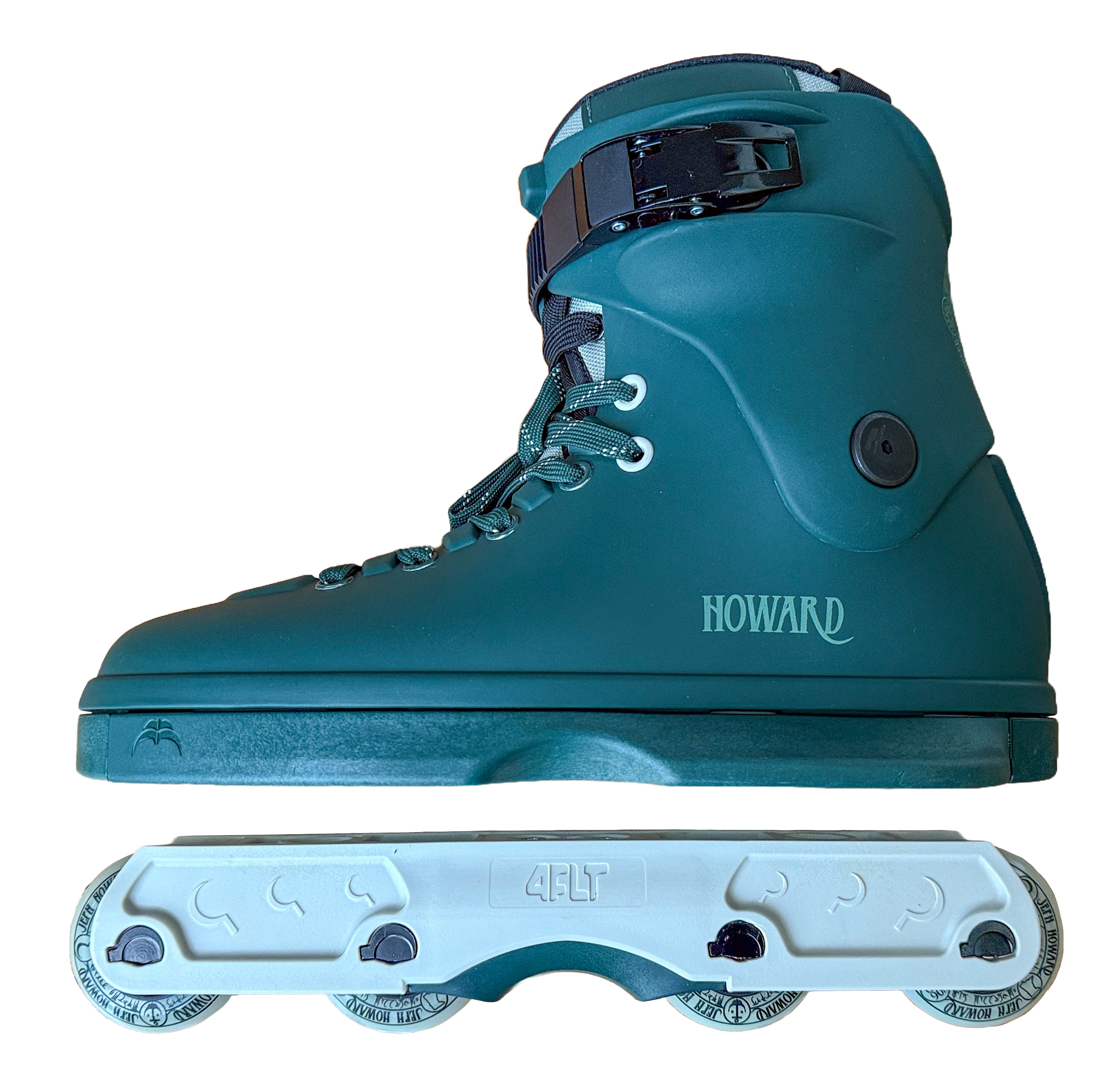
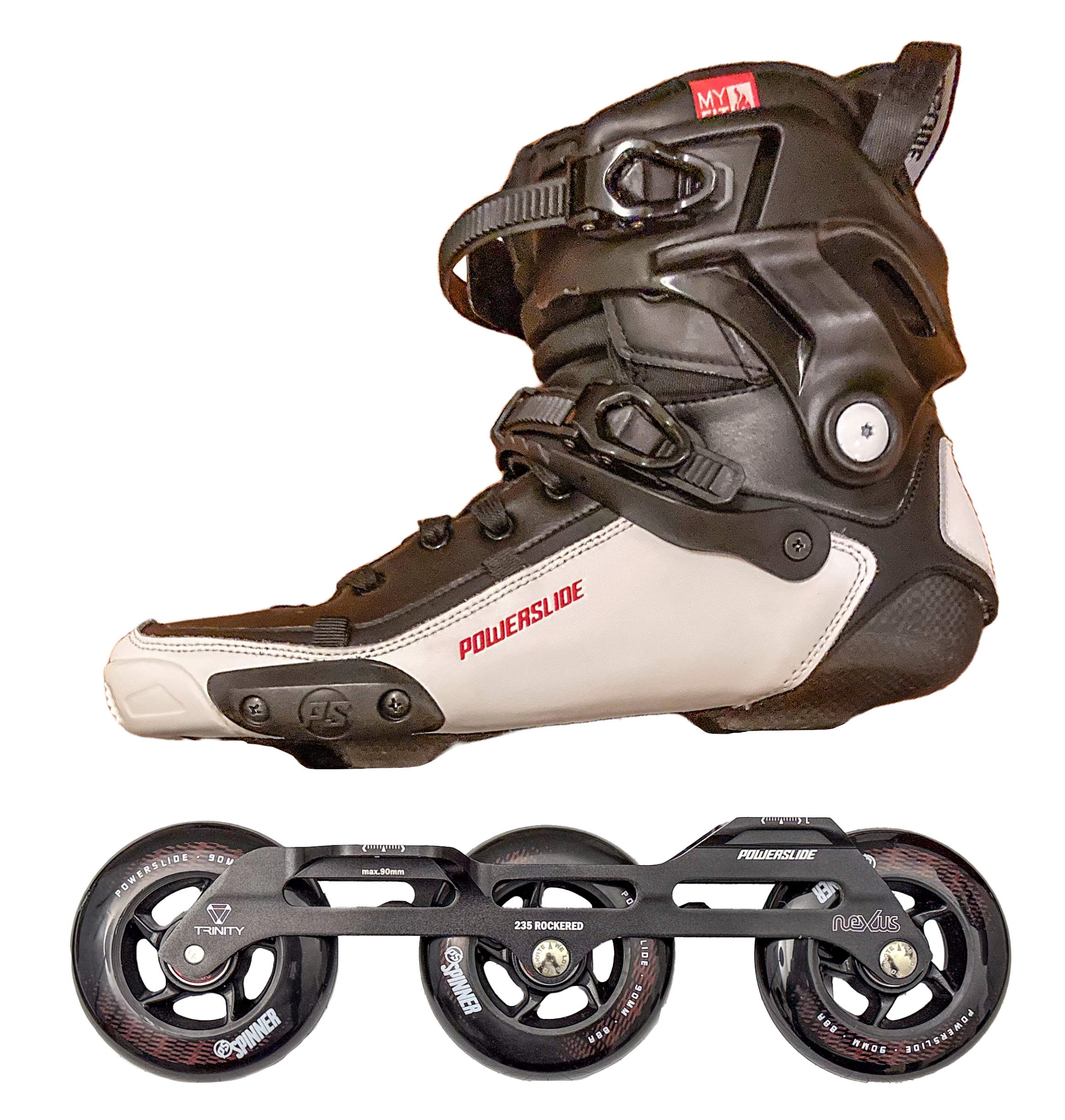
Level deck height (UFS, left) vs. raised heel (Trinity, right)

The term deck height sometimes refers to the distance from the frame's deck (i.e. mounting platform that the sole rests on) to the wheel axle center, excluding wheel size. In other cases, it is defined as sole-to-ground distance, incorporating both the structure of a frame and of actual wheel size. Adding to the confusion, some sources use ride height or frame height interchangeably for either of these measures. For UFS frames, which have two mounting points at the same height, a single deck height value suffices to describe the sole-to-axle distance. However, for 165mm and Trinity frames with a built-in heel lift, deck height must be specified as "front" or "rear." Notably, in Trinity-mount skates, "front deck height" does not measure the sole-to-ground distance. The two front mounts are positioned alongside the front wheels, allowing the ball of the foot to sit nearly as low as the wheel tops. (Note: The loosely defined terms "frame height," "deck height," and "ride height" are usually absent from the technical specifications of skates or frames. However, they are frequently used in reviews and buying guides for comparison. In the following articles, the distance from the bottom of a boot (i.e., the sole) to the ground is variously referred to as frame height, deck height, and ride height: Skating Magic archive, Inline Warehouse archive, Cadomotus archive, Loco Skates archive 1, and Loco Skates archive 2. Similarly, the distance from the top of a mount (i.e., roughly the sole) to the center of a wheel axle is described as deck height and ride height in these articles: Atom Skates archive and Loco Skates archive 3. Only in rare instances, such as on this product page, does "frame height" actually refer to the physical measurement of the frame itself.)

== Rigidity ==
Frame rigidity is essential for an efficient transfer of power from a skater's foot to the ground. A rigid frame does not suffer from elastic hysteresis. For this reason, even entry-level inline skates often use fiberglass-reinforced plastic, instead or softer but cheaper plastic to make frames. For a stiffer yet lightweight frame, aircraft-grade aluminum alloys such as the 6000 and 7000 series are used. Hockey and speed skating often call for magnesium frames, which are even stiffer and lighter than aluminum. Some speed skaters use carbon fiber frames that are the most rigid and lightweight frames available.

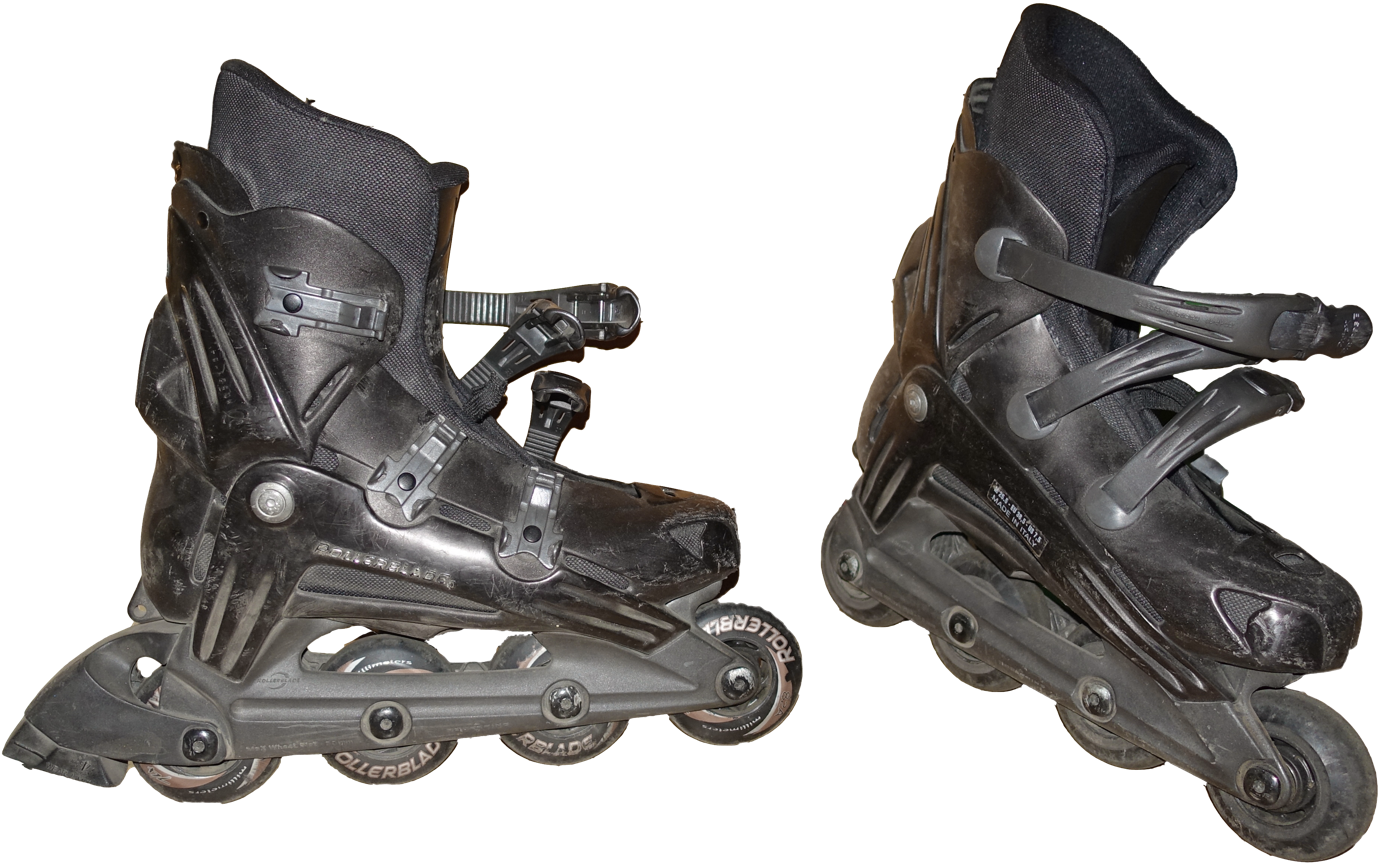
Plastic frames

In general, stiffer frames require more expensive materials and manufacturing processes. The cheapest options are plastic frames, which are injection-molded with PVC, polypropylene, polyurethane or nylon. These are soft and flexible, thus not suitable outside of low-end skates. Fiberglass-reinforced plastic is more rigid, and is widely used in recreational frames.

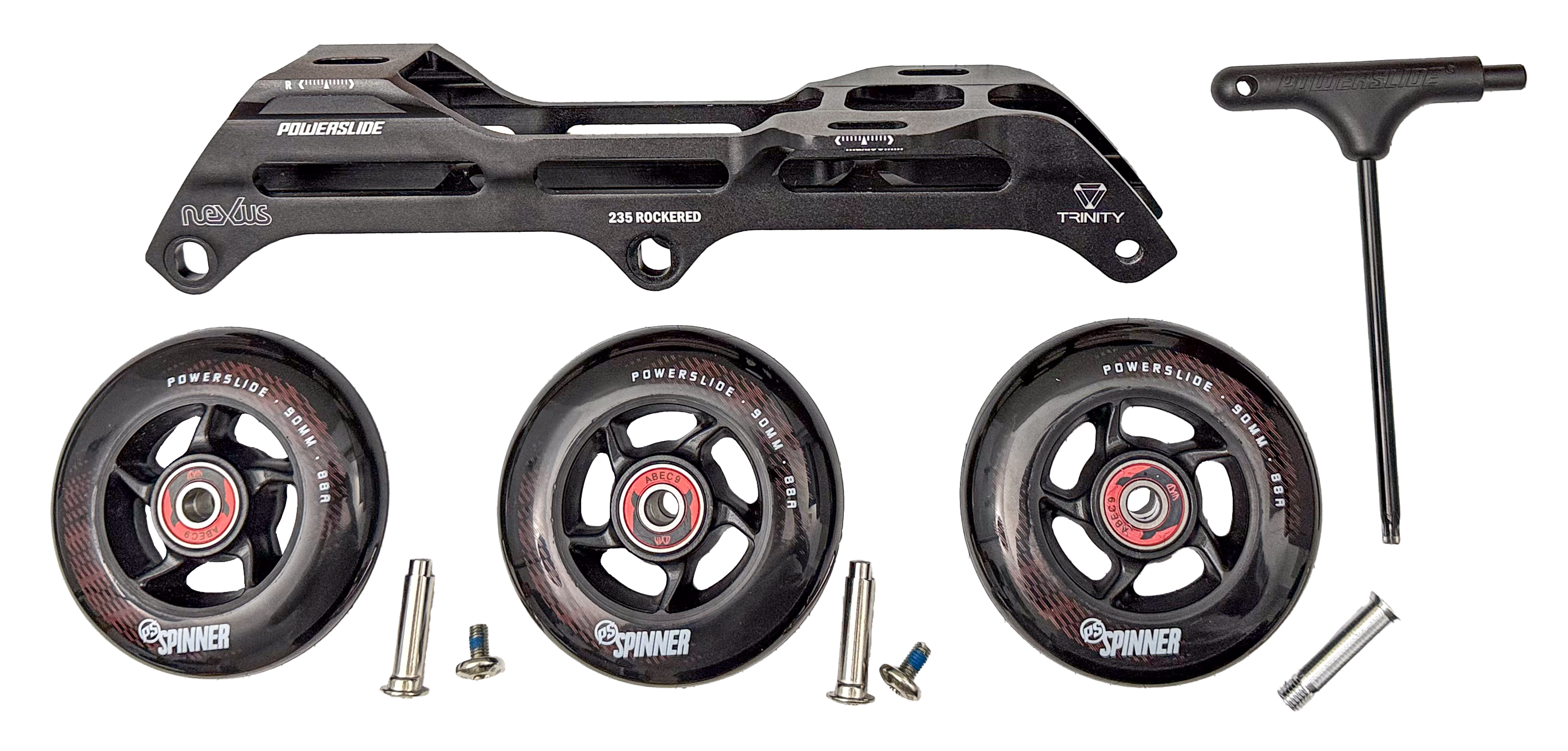
Extruded & CNC-milled

Metal frames are produced from aluminum, magnesium and titanium alloys using a variety of processes. Folding a metal sheet is the cheapest option, resulting in a frame less rigid compared to other processes. Die casting is a step up from folding, but the resulting frame is more brittle. Extrusion followed by finishing milling is much more expensive, but produces a very rigid frame. The most expensive option is to run computer-controlled milling (CNC) on a block of metal, called a billet, and carve a frame out of the block.

Rigidity of a frame is an important factor in choosing one. However, other considerations, including cost and weight, also influence the decision. Sometimes, a discipline's needs trump many of these factors. For instance, aggressive skaters exclusively use fiberglass-reinforced plastic frames for their superior performance and consistent friction when grinding against all types of surfaces. Some of the most rigid frames, such as those made of carbon fiber, can be too brittle for hockey. These frames shatter rather than deform under impact or extreme stress due to their low fracture toughness. In addition, some skaters value comfort, which is at odds with rigid frames; increased rigidity transmits all imperfections of the road surface to the skater unattenuated, reducing comfort.

== Rockerable ==
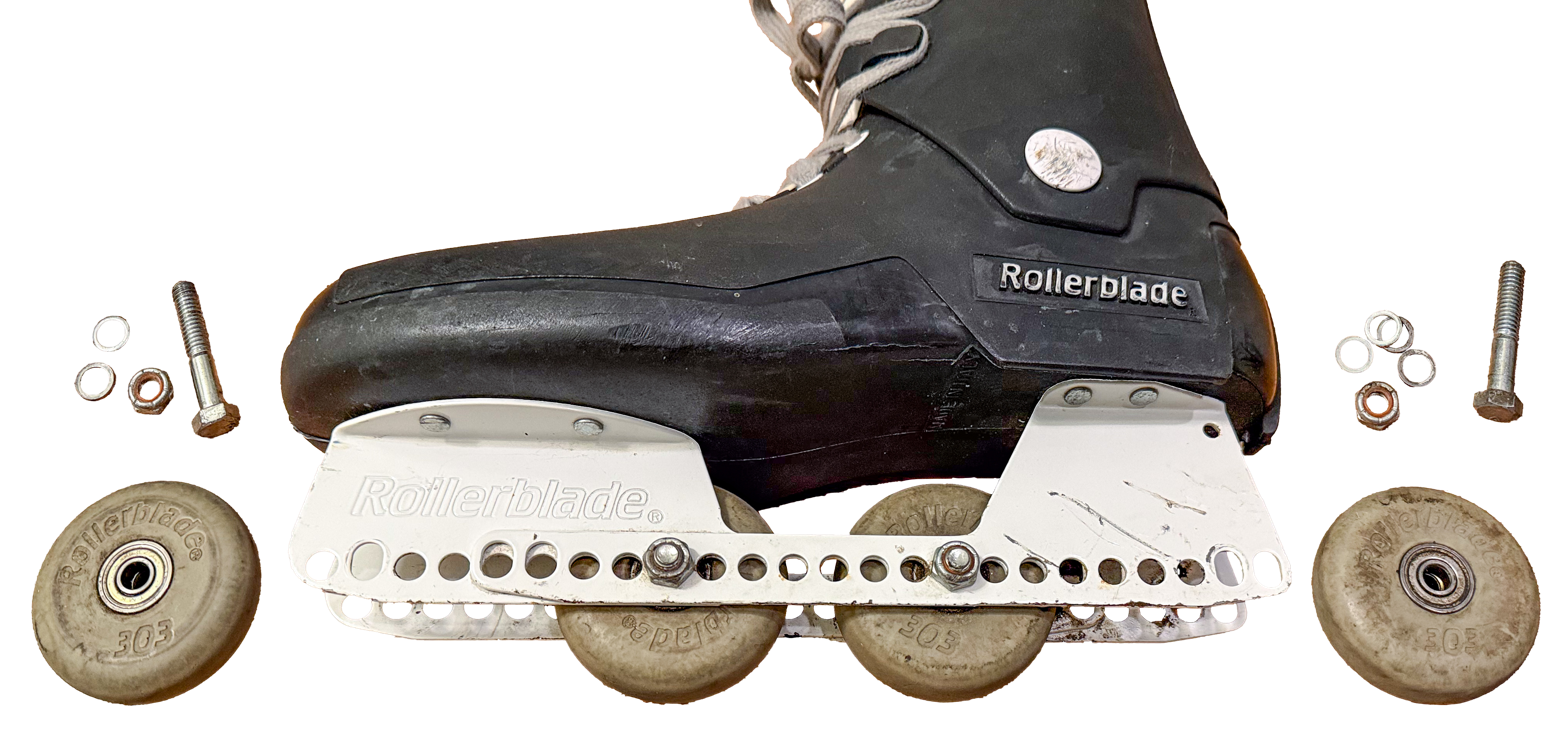
Oblong mounting holes: 1980s

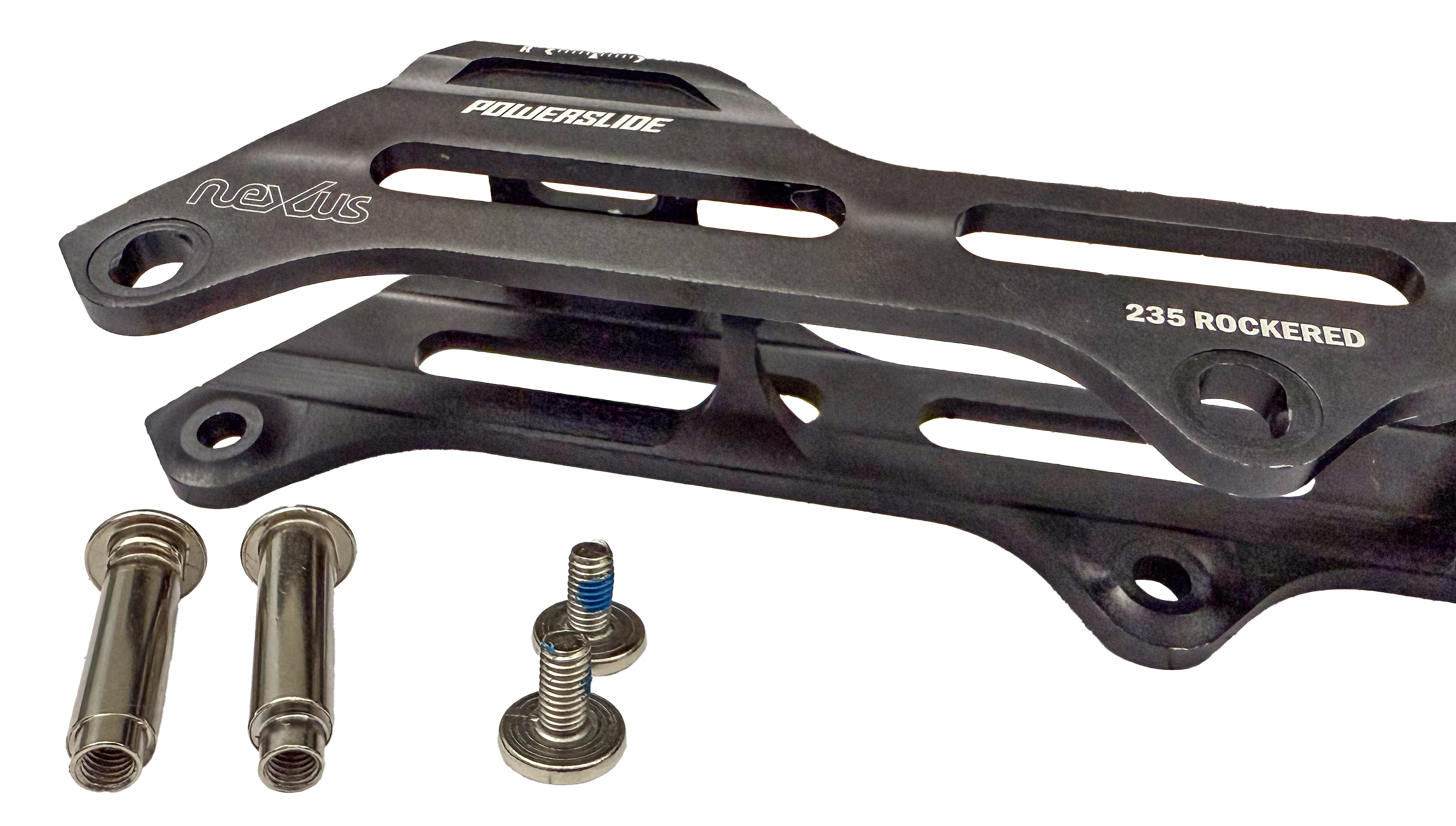
Toggleable axle bolts: 2020

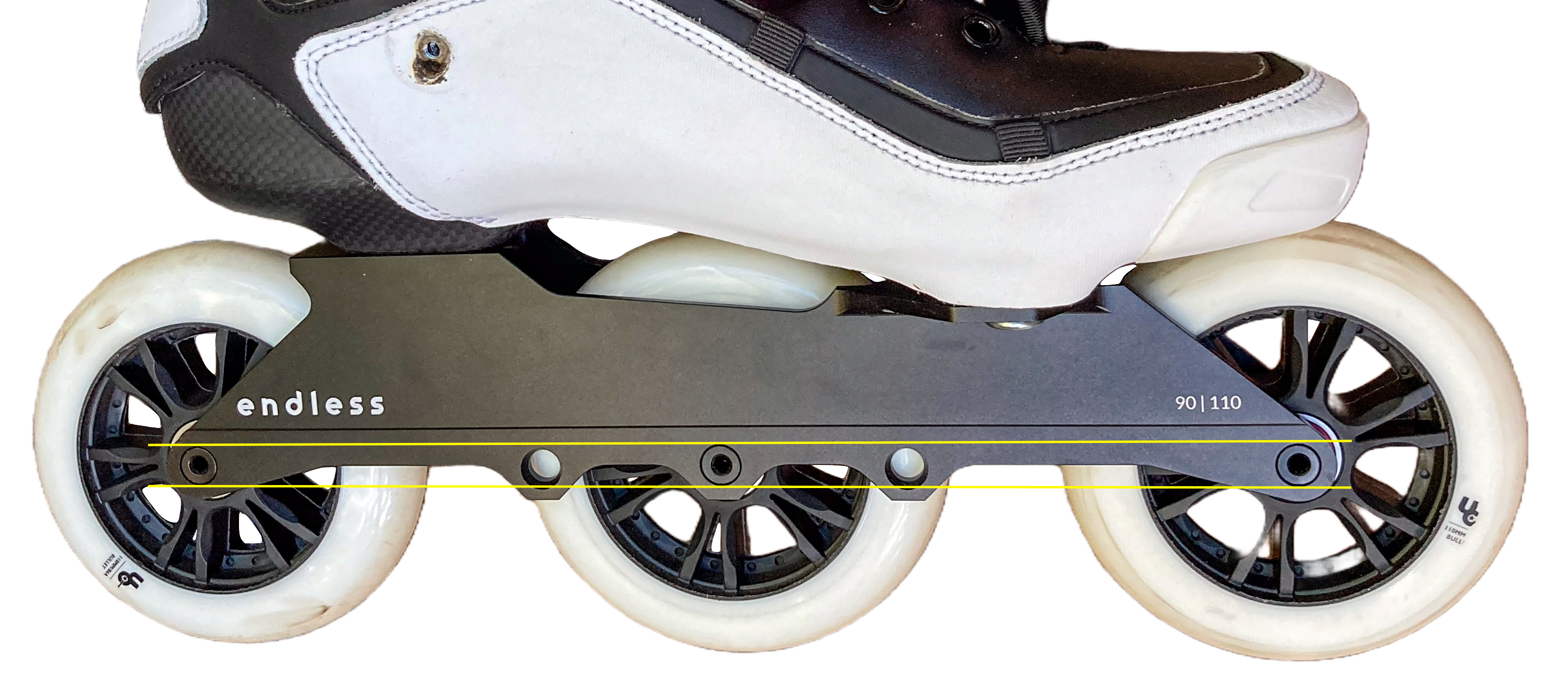
Fixed rockered setup: 2025

Wheel rockering can be achieved by using wheels of different diameters, or by using a frame with built-in support for a rockered arrangement of identical wheels. Modern inline skates of the 1980s came standard with oblong mounting holes as a standard feature on their frames. These holes allowed skaters to configure their skates with the same wheels in either a flat setup for long-distance skating, or a banana-rockered setup for highly maneuverable disciplines like hockey, with sharp turns and quick footwork.

Skate manufacturers subsequently devised various specialized hardware for quick and reliable switching of wheel setups. These involved the use of frame spacers, axle guides, mounting hole inserts, or axle bolts that fit oblong mounting holes in two ways. Such hardware can be toggled to shift the axle's center between two preset positions. (Note: Brennan Olson's patent application filed in 1987 described key innovations in the 1988 Lightning skate: a single-piece plastic frame with reinforcement bridges, toggleable inserts for mounting hole for rockering (named axle aperture plug in the specification), and wheel hubs each with an interlock rim (named outer annular ring 16P) over which polyurethane is molded to reduce wheel deformation and heat buildup.)

With the advent of mounting standards and easily-swappable frames in the 21st century, some inline frames now eschew toggleable hardware in pursuit of reduction in complexity, weight, and number of components. Each brand offers its own pre-rockered frame with custom axle holes to create a wheel arrangement that it deems optimal. For instance, the Endless 90 Trinity frame provides a flat setup when configured with three 110 mm wheels, and a slight rocker when set up with four 90 mm wheels. The rockering in the latter is more subtle than a standard banana rocker and is tuned for each wheelbase length. Wizard frames have a similar fixed setup that mimics an even milder banana rocker. Wizard frames are, in general, even longer than Endless frames. Therefore, even though both shift the two middle mounting holes by similar amounts (1 mm to 2 mm), the rockered profile on Endless is further attenuated.

== Non-standard ==
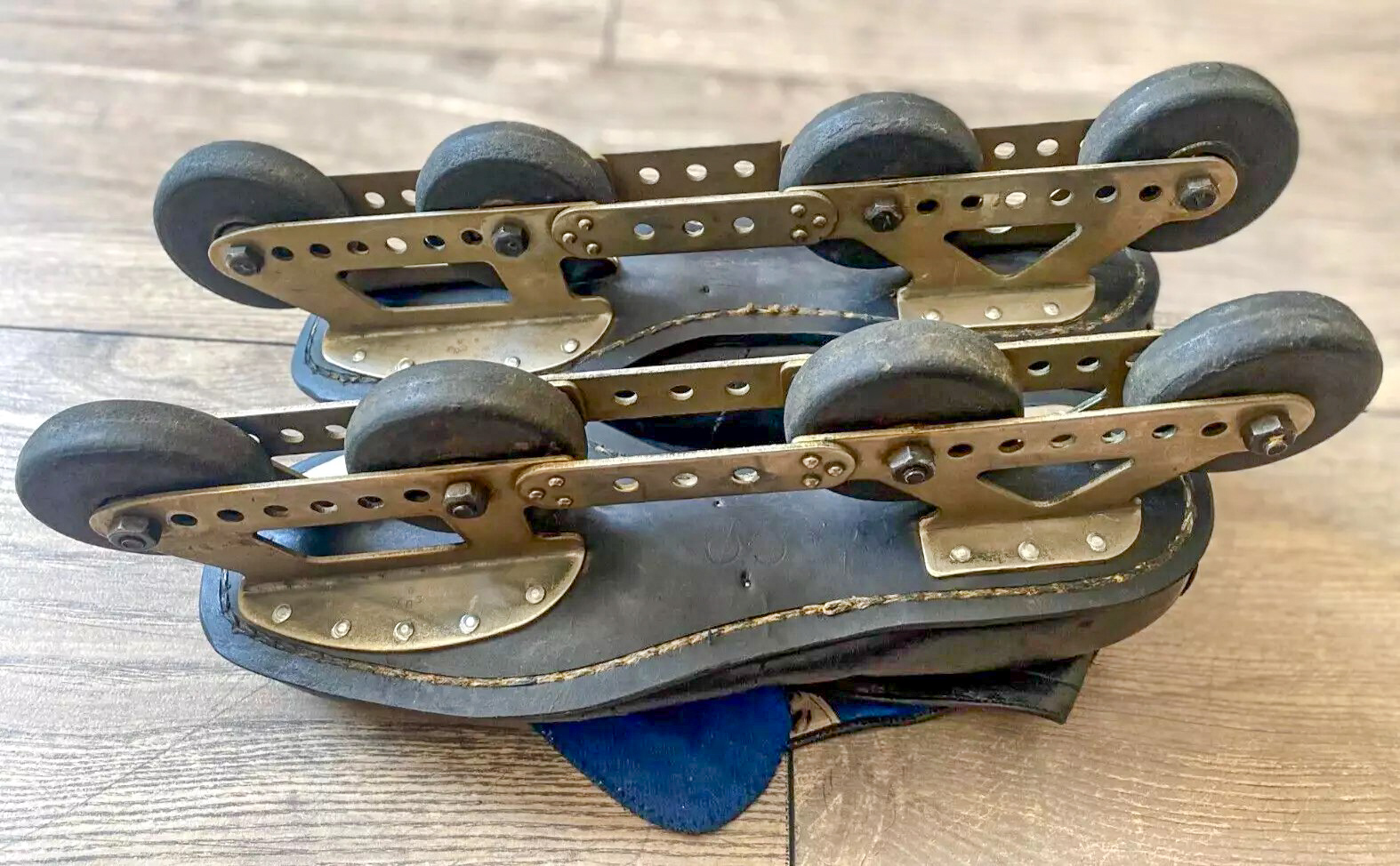
USSR skates (1960s)

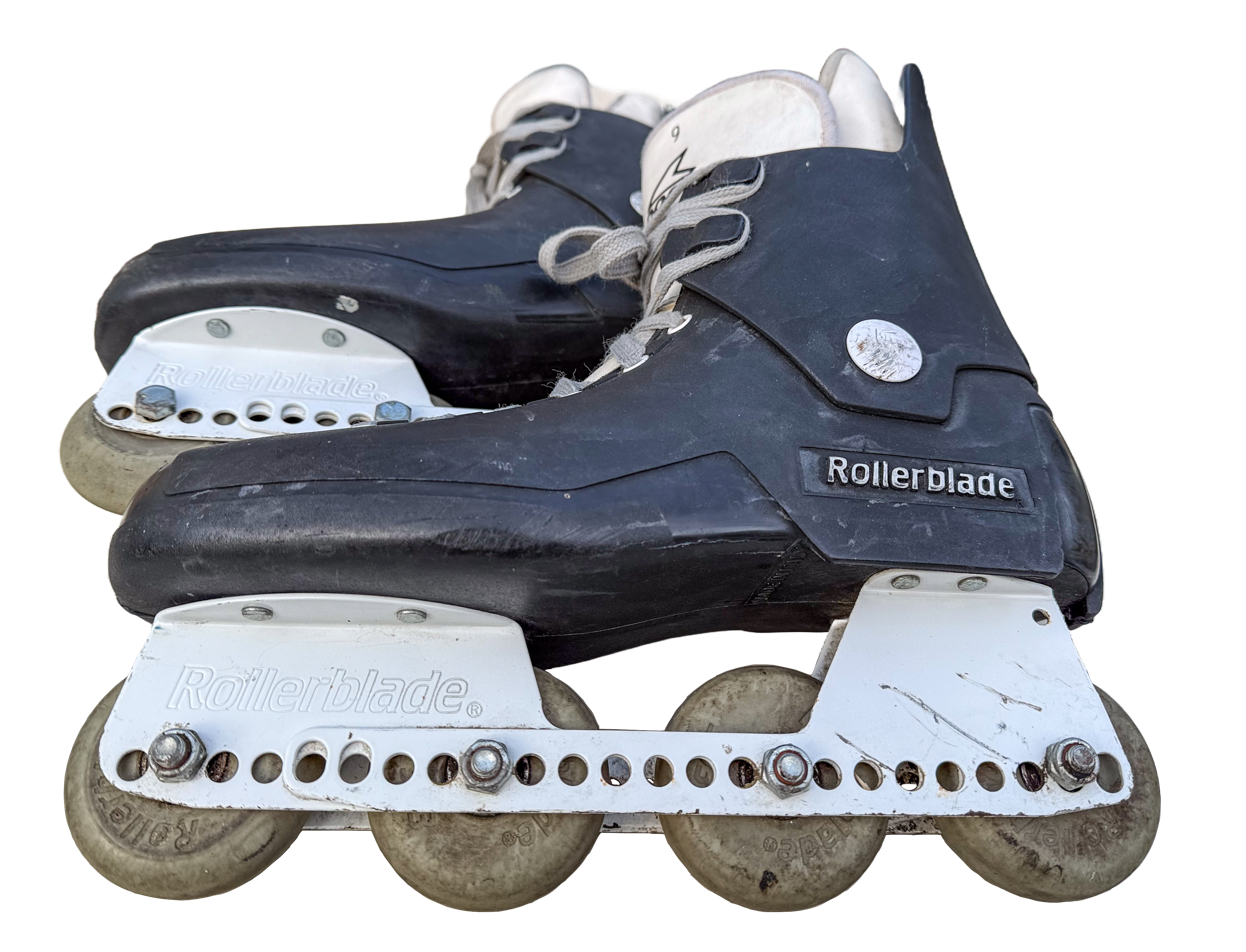
Rollerblade (1980s)

Modern inline skates started as off-season training tools for ice skaters. Many early inline frames were designed to be length-adjustable, so that each skater could have inline skates tailored to their individual shoe size. For instance, inline skates made for the USSR speed skating team in the 1960s accommodated differences in shoe sizes by using a variable length connector between the front and rear mounting platforms, and by allowing wheels to be mounted at different locations on the frame. This tradition continued and was further expanded in the 1966 Chicago Roller-Blade and in Rollerblade skates from the early 1980s. (Note: See ads for the Chicago Roller-Blade in the 1965 Fall & Winter Montgomery Ward catalog, page 1082, archived here, and in the 1965 Spring & Summer Catalog, page 846, archived here.) (Note: See pictures of the new generation of early Rollerblade skates with heel brakes, from Vintage Minnesota Hockey: picture, picture, picture and picture, archived here, here, here and here. These have a refined version of the adjustable frame from the Ultimate Street Skate, and a similar hard boot. These skates witnessed the transition of Scott Olson's company from "Ole's Innovative Sports", to "North American Sports Training Corp.", and finally to "Rollerblade", as attested by marketing materials.)

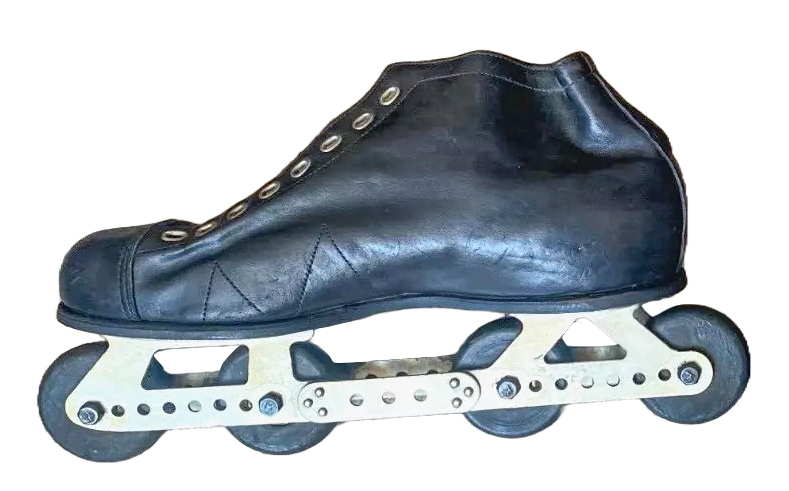
USSR skate (1962)

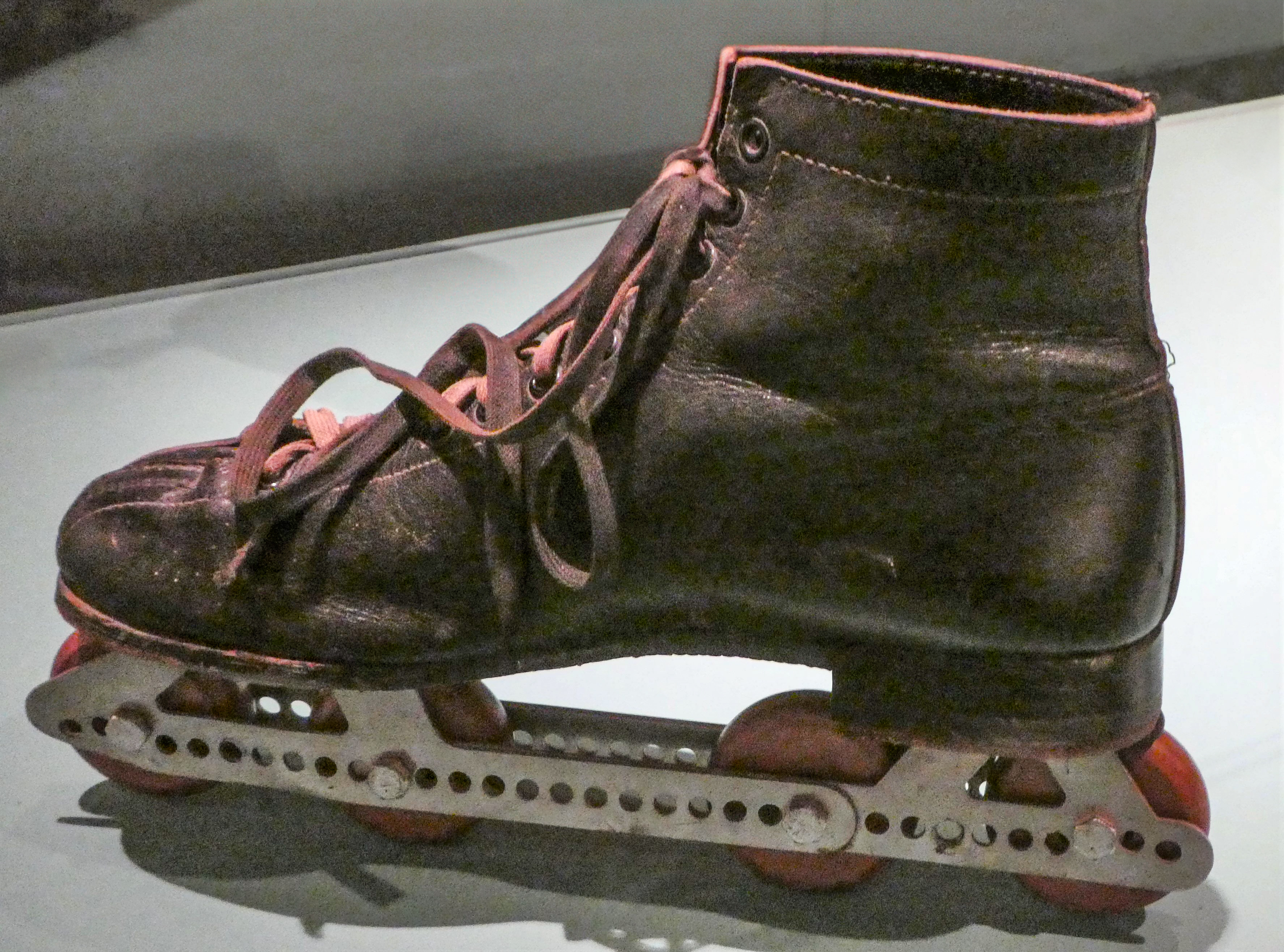
Chicago skate (1966)

There were no standards for boots, frames, or the way frames were mounted onto boots. For instance, the 1962 USSR skate and the 1966 Chicago Roller-Blade were designed to be mounted onto a flat sole, or an equivalent dress shoe with a front sole level with the heel. On the other hand, the 1975 Super Sport Skate was modeled after ice hockey skates, and had a frame with a raised heel mount, resulting in a built-in heel lift (or heel-to-toe drop). (Note: See ad for Super Sport Skates endorsed by Ralph Backstrom in "Faceoff" 73 / 74 season by World Hockey Association. Also see archived pictures one, two, three and four, from an antique listing.)

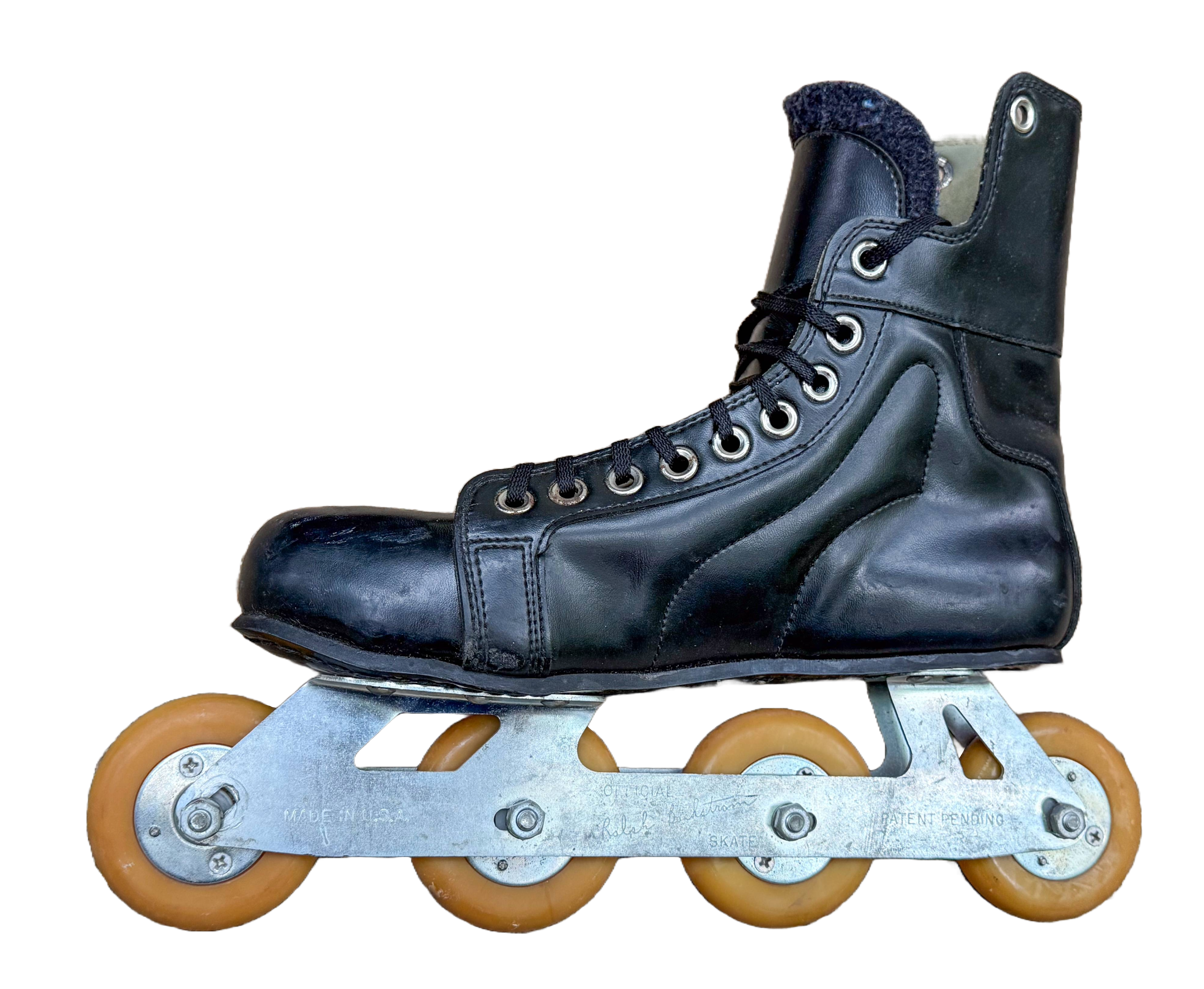
Super Sport Skate (1975)

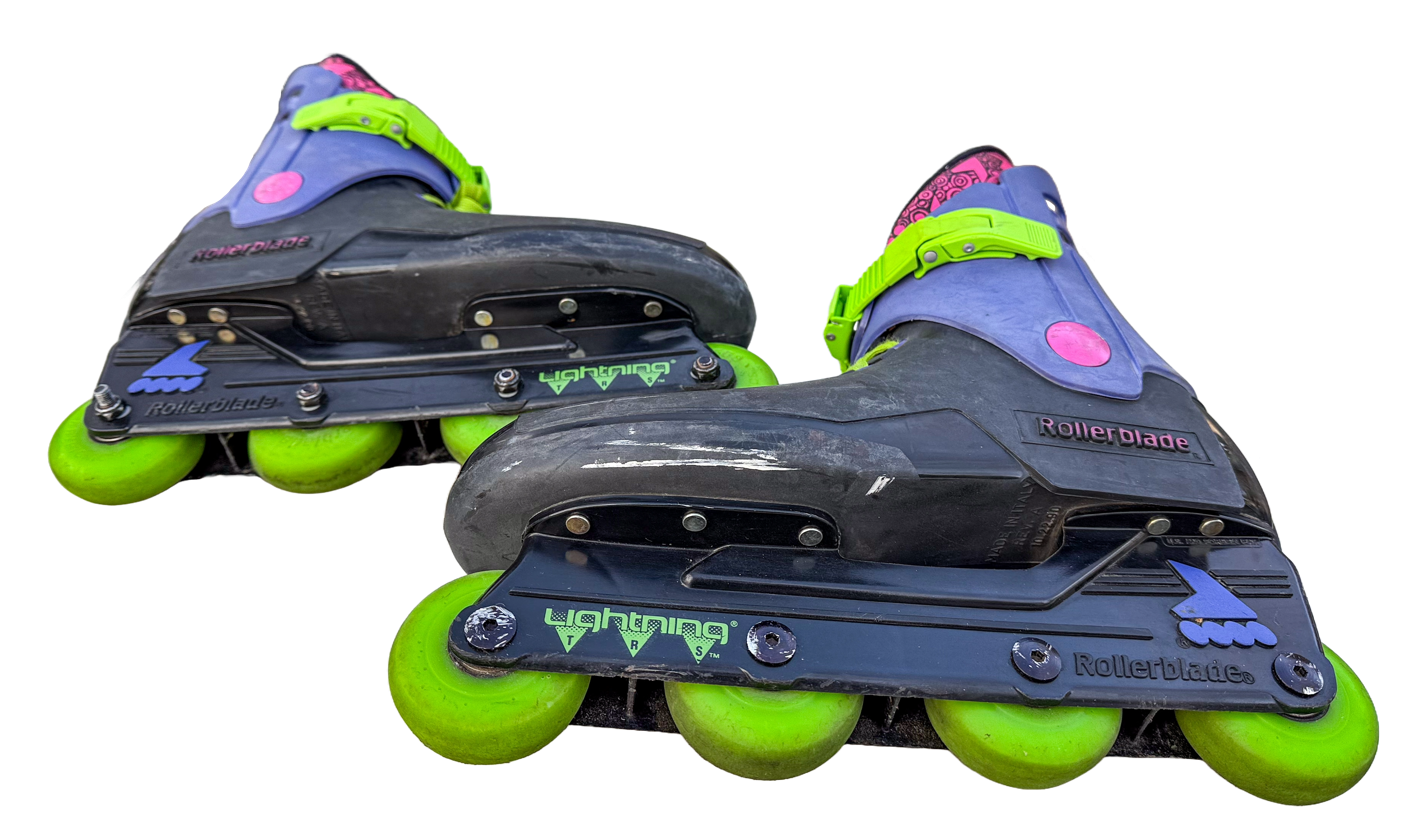
Lightning TRS (1988)

These early inline skates featured frames that were riveted to the boots, mirroring the construction method used in ice skate manufacturing. The lack of standards and the fixed-mounting process made it hard to mix and match boots and frames. For instance, early 1981 prototypes of the Ultimate Hockey Skate by Scott Olson had a flat Chicago frame mounted onto an ice hockey boot. This required that an artificial heel disc be inserted in between the frame and the boot to make up for the heel lift designed into the hockey boot. (Note: See the article image (archived here) of this Rollerblade article from 2019 (archived here) for a glimpse of a prototype with a flat Chicago frame mounted onto an ice hockey boot, with a yellow heel disc. The article includes a gallery at the end, where this picture (archived here) shows a number of skaters wearing inline skates thus custom-made, again, with heel discs.)

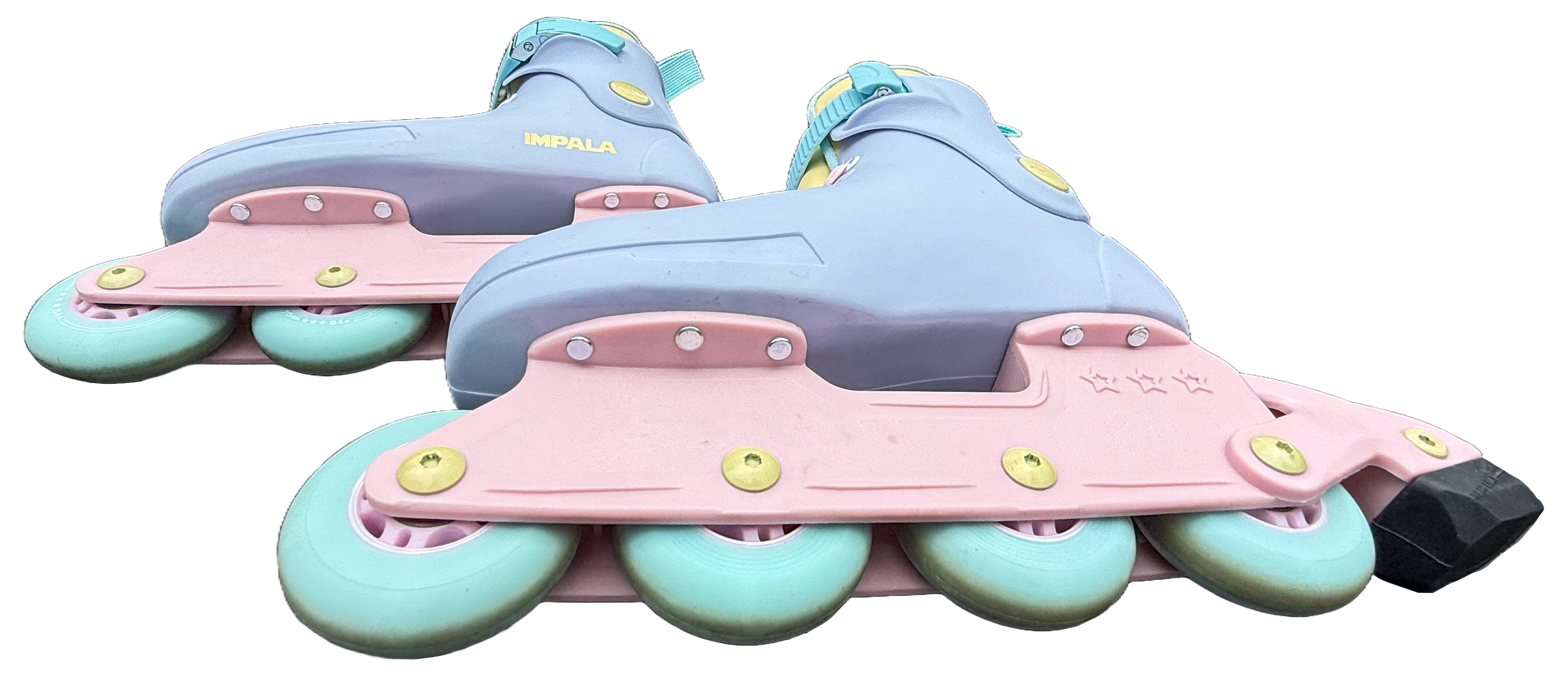
Roces Impala (2023)

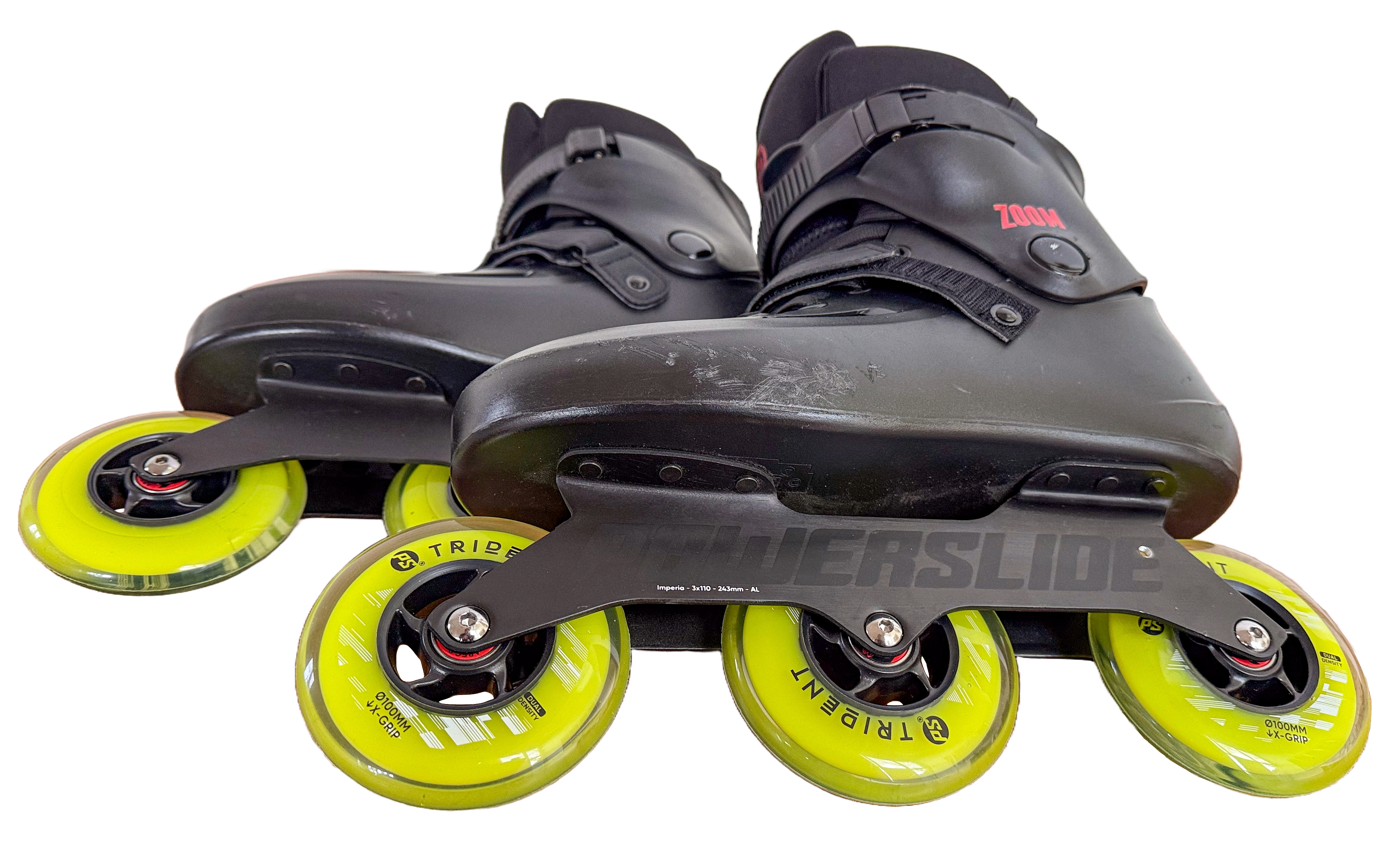
PS One Zoom (2024)

Non-standard inline frames still dominate the entry-level market. Many such frames are not replaceable. Most cannot be adjusted to compensate for a skater's ankle pronation or supination. Some beginner skates, such as the Powerslide One Zoom in 2024, continue to use riveted frames. These skates are fixed at the factory, and cannot be further customized.

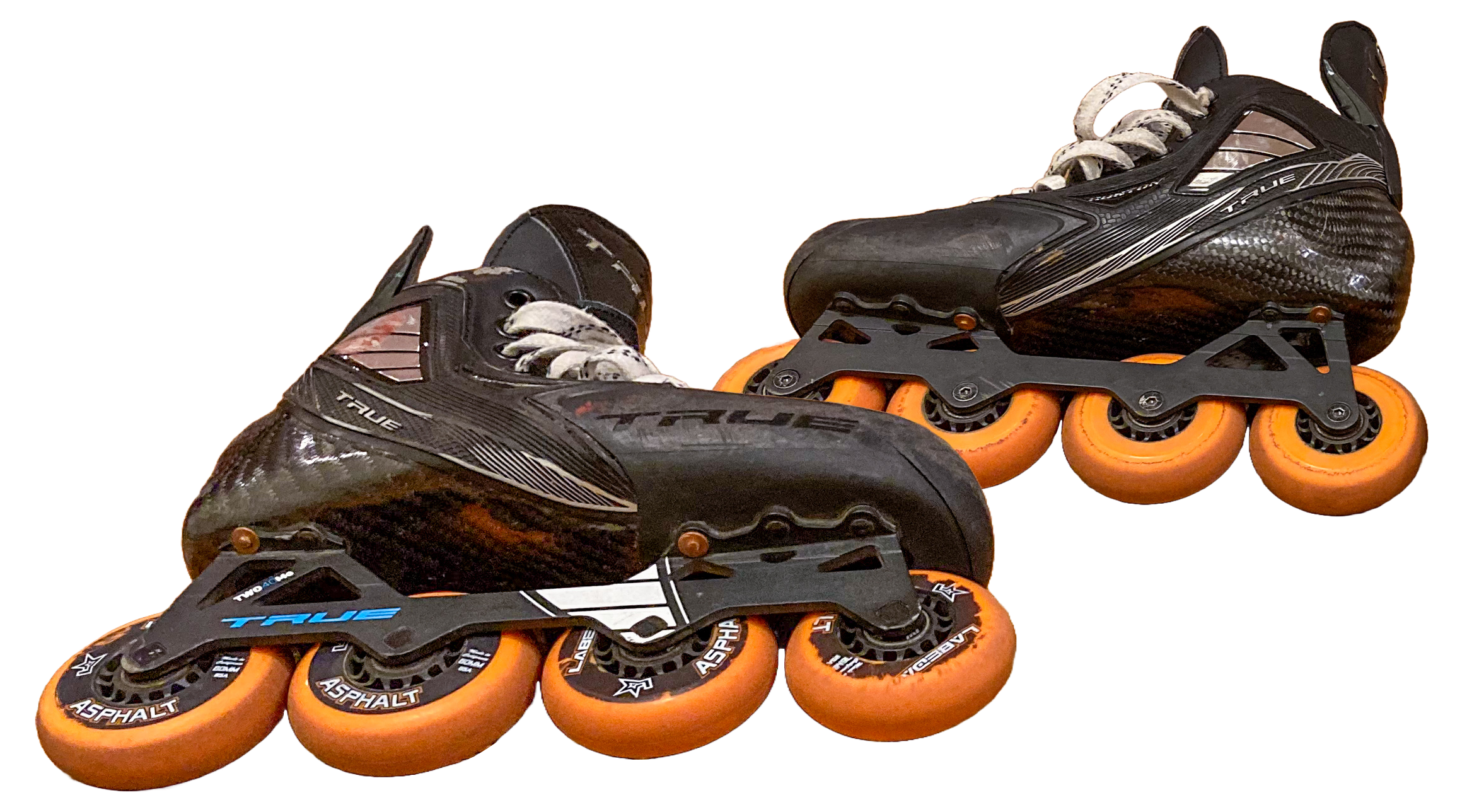
Hockey skates (2021)

Outside of the entry-level market, inline skates have largely consolidated around a few mounting standards. Aggressive skates and Wizard skates follow the UFS standard. Most speed skates use the 195mm two-point standard. The rest generally adopt the 165mm two-point standard. The Trinity standard with three mounting holes was created in 2016. It has been gaining popularity in urban skating, where skaters wish to mount bigger wheels with a minimal increase in frame height.

Only one type of inline skate does not follow any of these standards: the hockey skates. Inline hockey skates continue to use the same riveted mounting process as their ice hockey counterparts. All hockey skates, from inexpensive to high-end custom-molded ones, have proprietary frames that cannot be replaced or adjusted by players. (Note: See inline hockey skates made by ice hockey manufacturers, archived here: CCM Super Tacks 9370R, Bauer Vapor 3X Pro, Mission Inhaler WM02, True TF9 Roller Hockey Skate, and Marsblade R1 Kraft Crew.)

== 165mm and 195mm ==
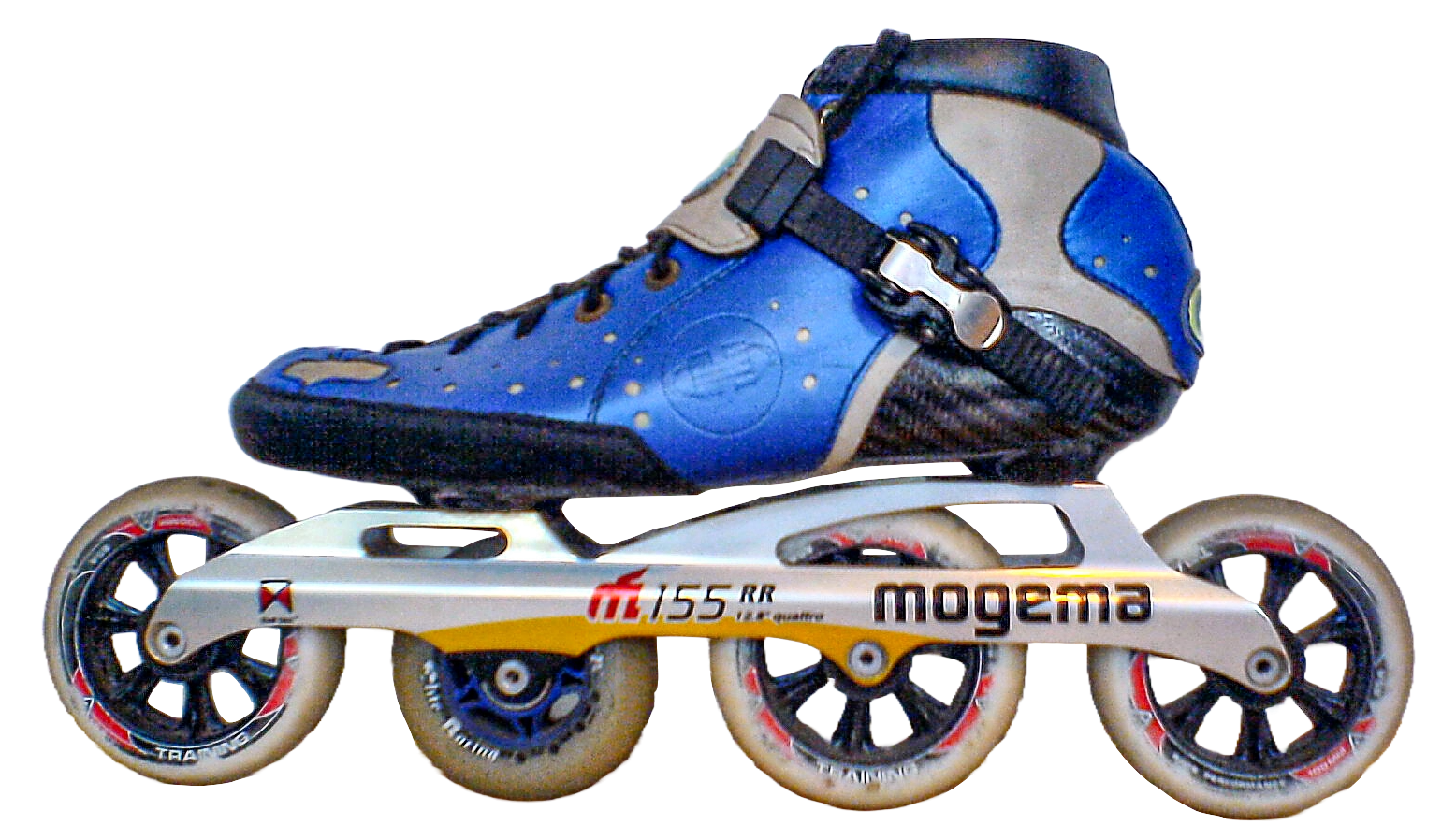
165mm speed boot

In 1974, Inze Bont, founder of the speed skate manufacturer Bont, created fiberglass-reinforced boots for short track racing, featuring 2 mounting holes spaced 165 mm apart. An adjustable ice blade was attached to the boot using these holes. As inline skating gained popularity in the mid-1980s, companies like Darkstar, Mogema, and Raps began producing inline frames designed to mount onto these short track boots. This led to the establishment of the first inline skate mounting standard.

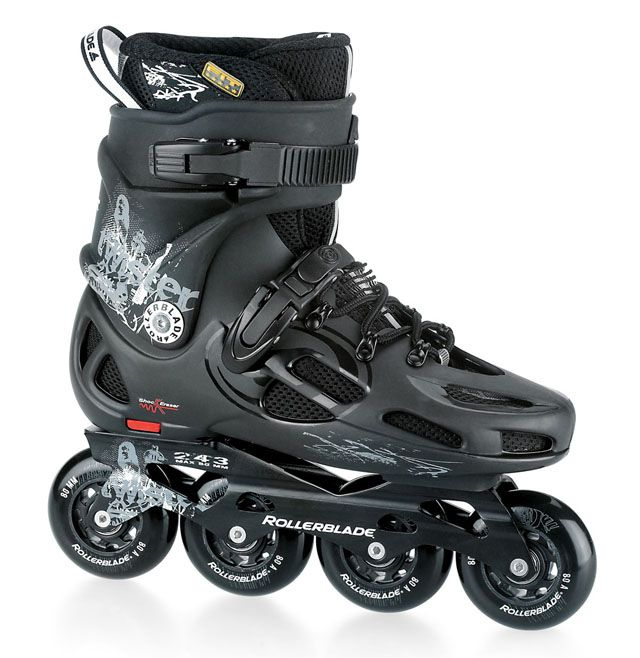
Rollerblade Twister 80 with a 165mm mount

The 165mm 2-point mounting standard incorporates a height differential of approximately 10 mm between the front and rear mounting points. This creates a heel lift, also known as pitch or heel-to-toe drop, allowing speed skaters to achieve more powerful push-offs through deeper dorsiflexion. Due to this height difference, the two mounting platforms on a frame are usually not contiguous. Other than the 165mm interaxial distance, the standard does not specify a frame width, mount width or exact mounting locations on the boot. In practice, Bont boots offer relatively small mounting surfaces between the frame and the boot compared to traditional rivet mounting. However, the rigid structure of their fiberglass speed boots allows frames to be secured with minimal flex. This is especially true of Bont’s later innovations, including kevlar boots introduced in 1986 and carbon fiber boots in 1989.

Roces Impala skates from the mid 1990s were the first to adopt the 165mm mounting standard outside of speed skating, paving the way for other inline skate manufacturers to follow. This standard became widely used across various inline skate disciplines, from recreational and aggressive skating to slalom skating. However, unlike speed boots, these disciplines do not rely solely on composite boots with extremely rigid soles. On softer soles, the small mounting platforms can cause the frame to wobble under load. To mitigate this, some boots reinforce the mounting areas with metal plates.

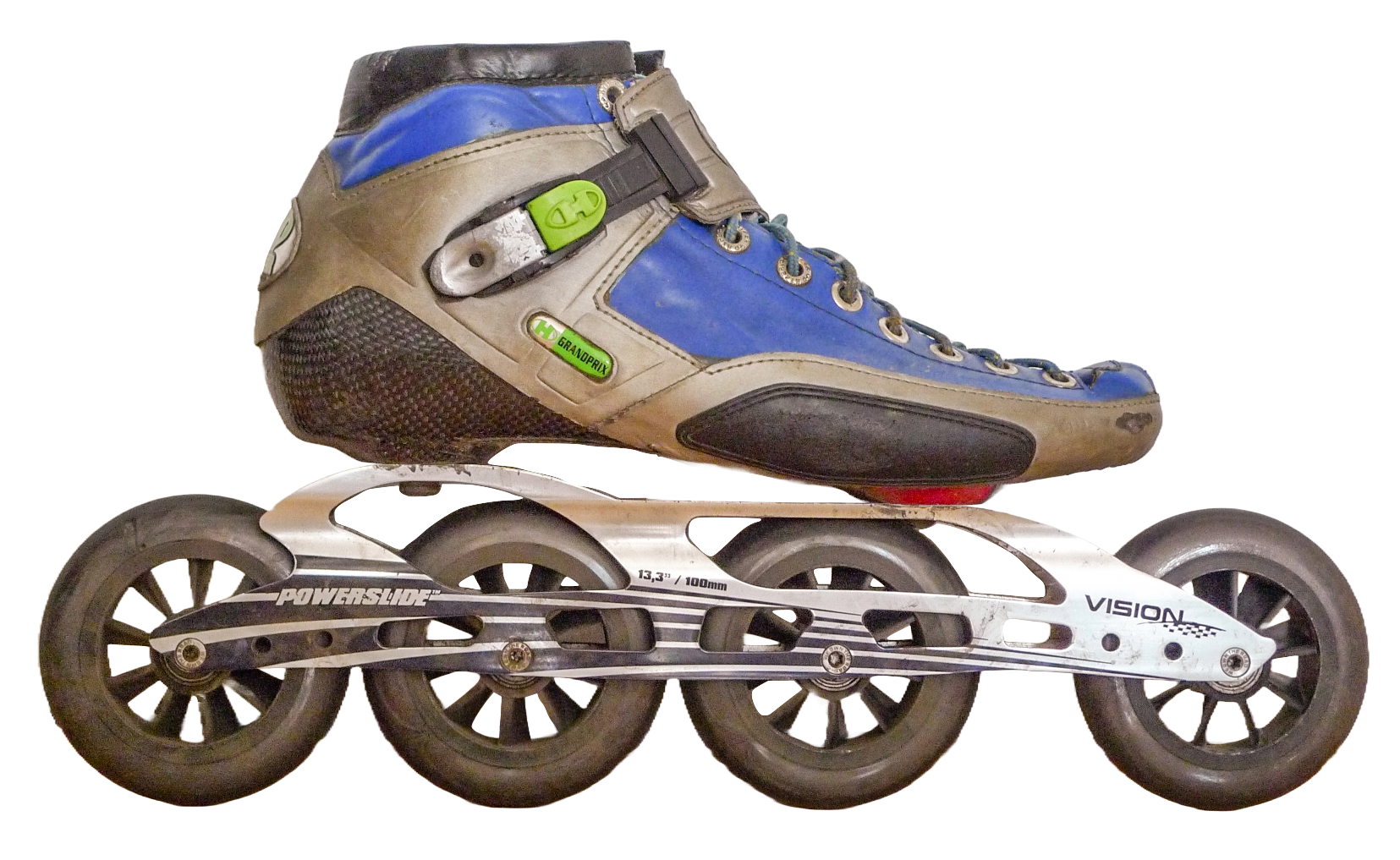
Relocated & reduced 2nd wheel to fit 165mm mounting

The 165mm standard, also known as SSM (Standard Speed Mount), was developed when speed skates primarily used five small wheels (e.g. 5x80mm). However, as longer frames with fewer but larger wheels became popular (e.g. 4x100mm), the positioning of the mounting bolts interfered with some wheels, forcing frames to become taller. This increased a skate's center of gravity and reduced a skater's performance. Some speed frames relocated middle wheels or reduce their sizes to fit the standard.

To address this, the 195mm 2-point standard was introduced in 2003, also known as LSM (Long Speed Mount). By increasing the interaxial distance to 195mm, this standard prevented bolts from interfering with middle wheels, enabling the use of larger wheels and longer frames without increasing frame height. This design provides a stable ride at high speeds by maintaining a relatively low center of gravity in proportion to the longer wheelbase.

The 195mm standard retains the same heel lift as the 165mm standard. In general, only speed skating boots use 195mm, while most other inline boots continue to rely on 165mm. However, many inline frames include dual mounting slots on the front mount to accommodate boots of either standard.

== UFS ==
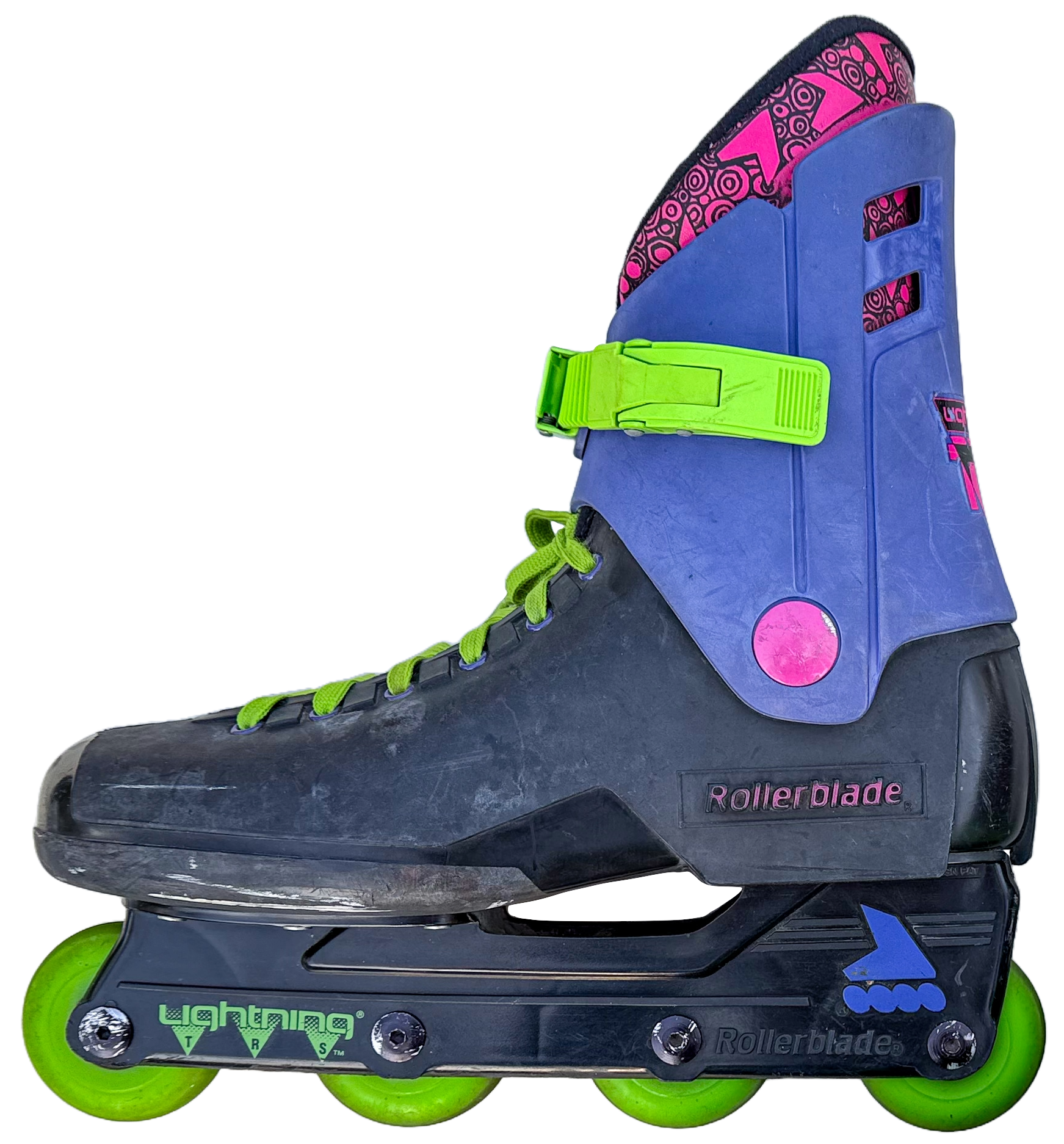
Rollerblade TRS

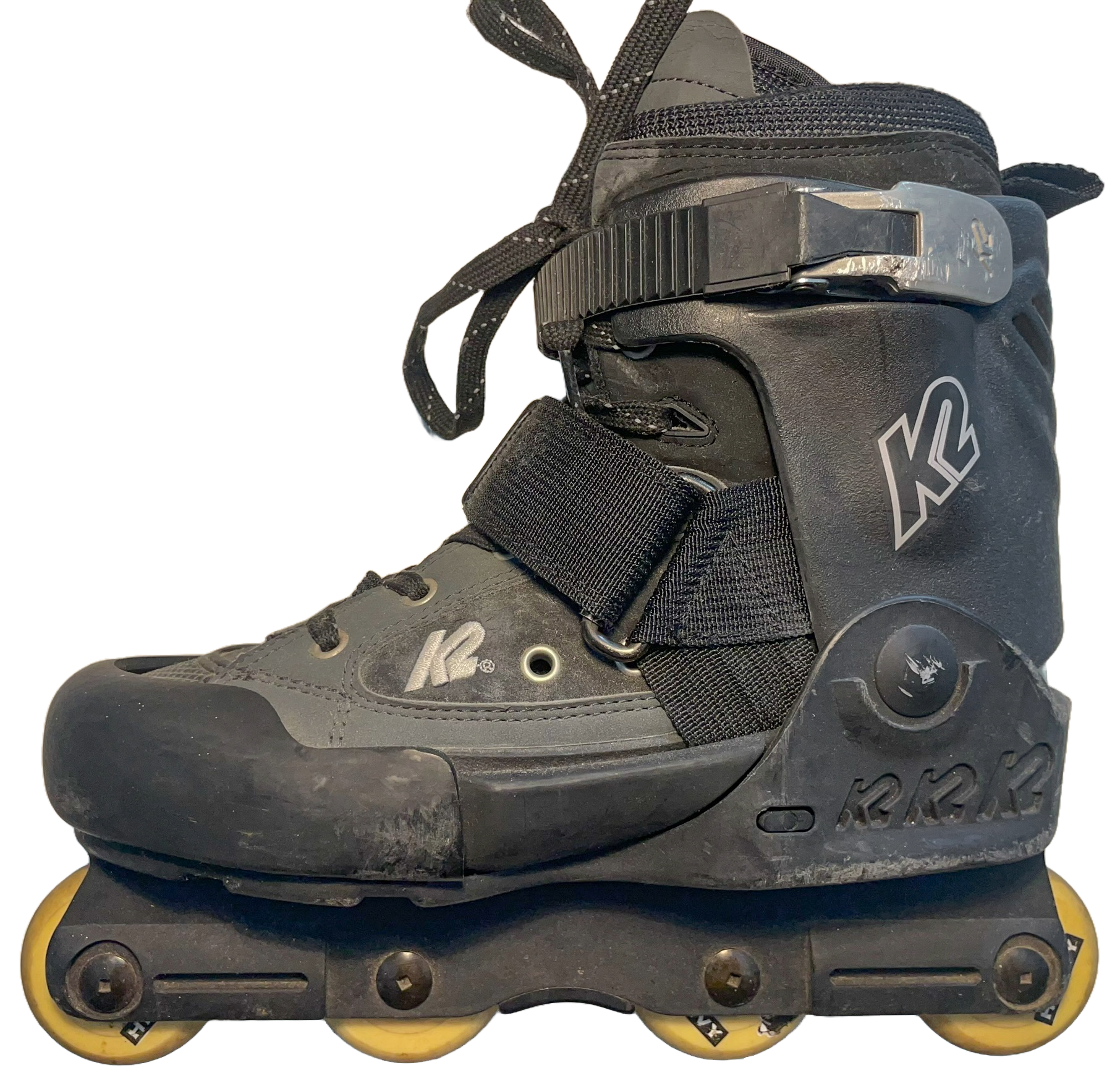
K2 Fatty Pro

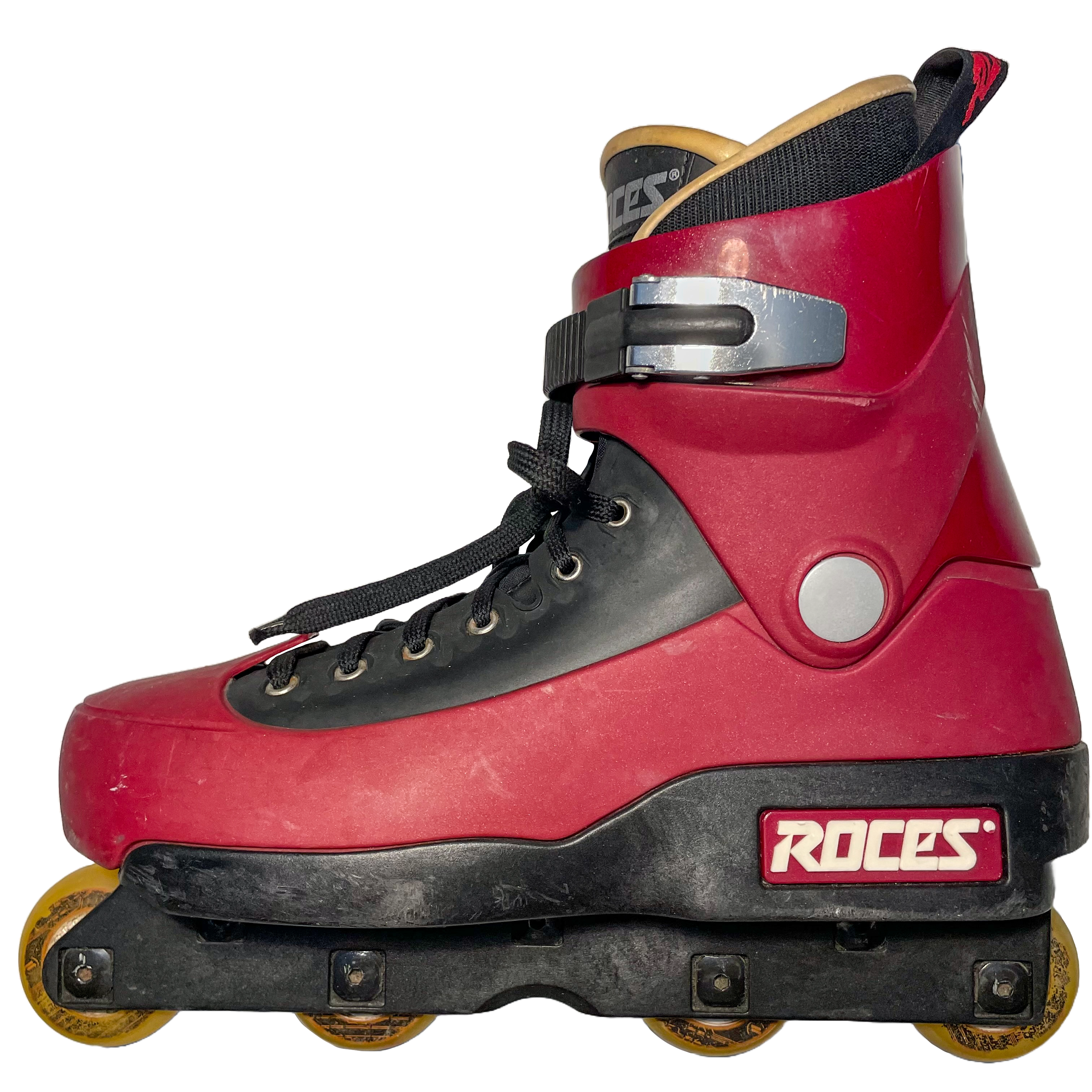
Roces 5th Element

Three skates in the evolution toward the UFS standard

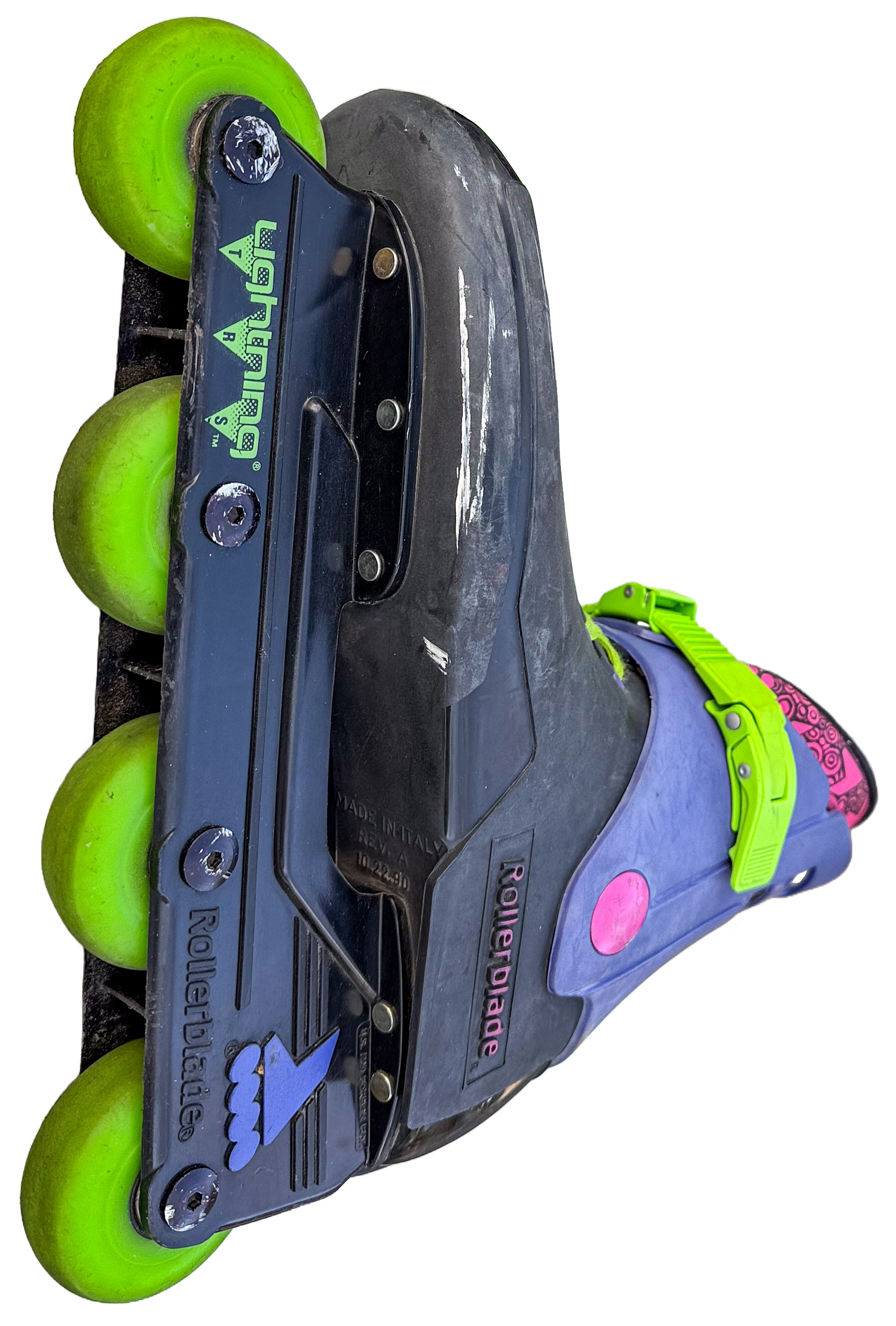
TRS

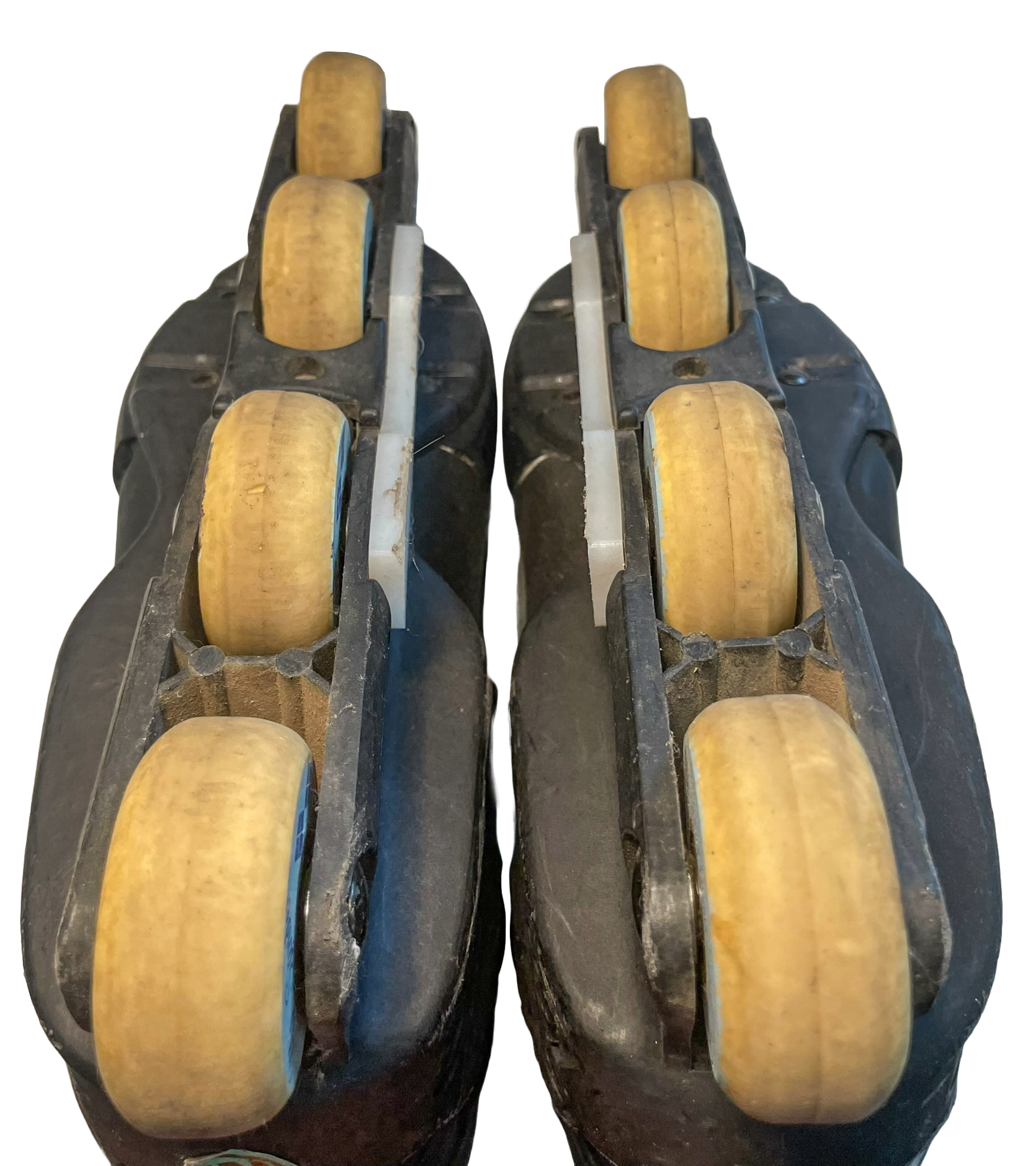
K2 Fatty Pro

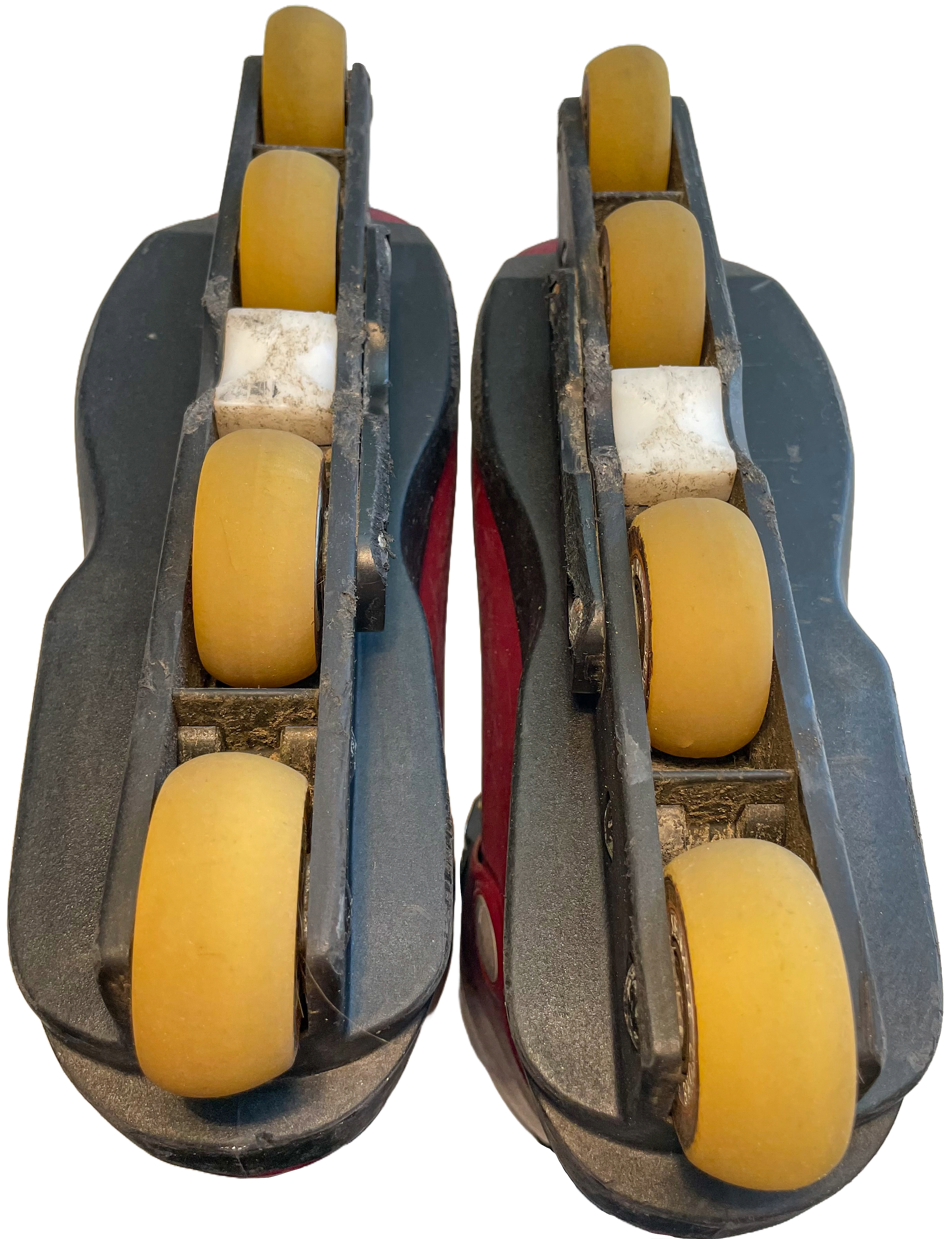
5th Element

Three skates in the evolution toward the UFS standard

The ESPN X Games introduced aggressive inline skating in 1995, propelling the sport into the spotlight. As its popularity grew, more enthusiasts took up aggressive skating, prompting companies to develop their own specialized skate lines to meet the rising demand.

In 1996, K2 released the Fatty, a legendary skate that integrated the wheel frame into its soulplate for the first time. In this early stage of its evolution, the soulplate still consisted of two separate sections, a design inherited from riveted boots with separate toe and heel mounting platforms, as seen in the Rollerblade Lightning TRS. However, the K2 Fatty reduced the height difference between these mounting platforms, and eliminated the hollow between these two platforms. It frame was now shaped like a solid rectangular bar.

In 1998, Roces too, released an aggressive skate featuring a combined soulplate and frame: the 5th Element. This design not only incorporated a rectangular frame without distinct mounting platforms, but also featured a completely flat soulplate with no height difference between the front and rear sections. This flat sole significantly improved soul grinding and was soon adopted by other skate manufacturers. Additionally, the 5th Element’s integrated soul/frame unit could be easily removed from the boot by loosening just three screws.

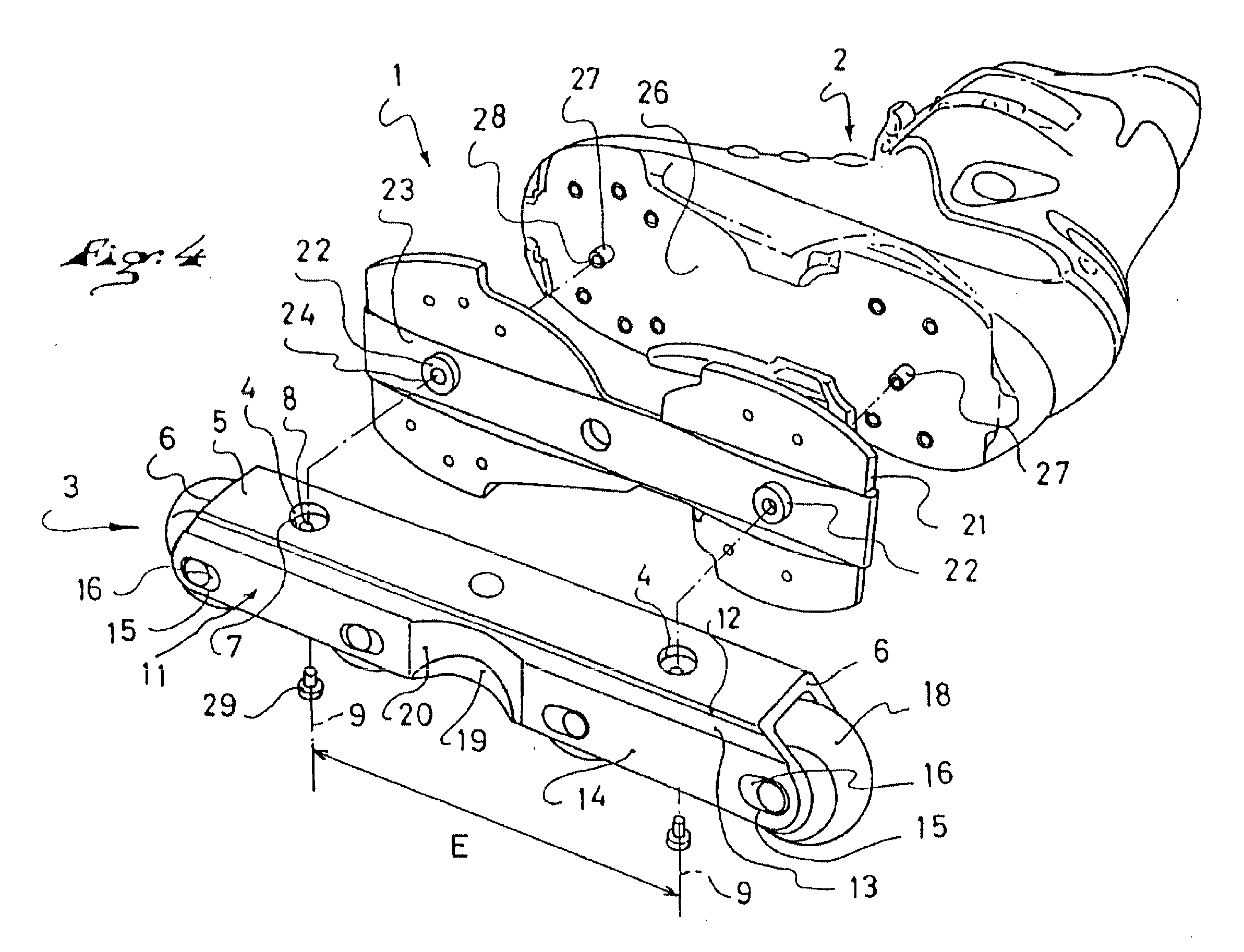
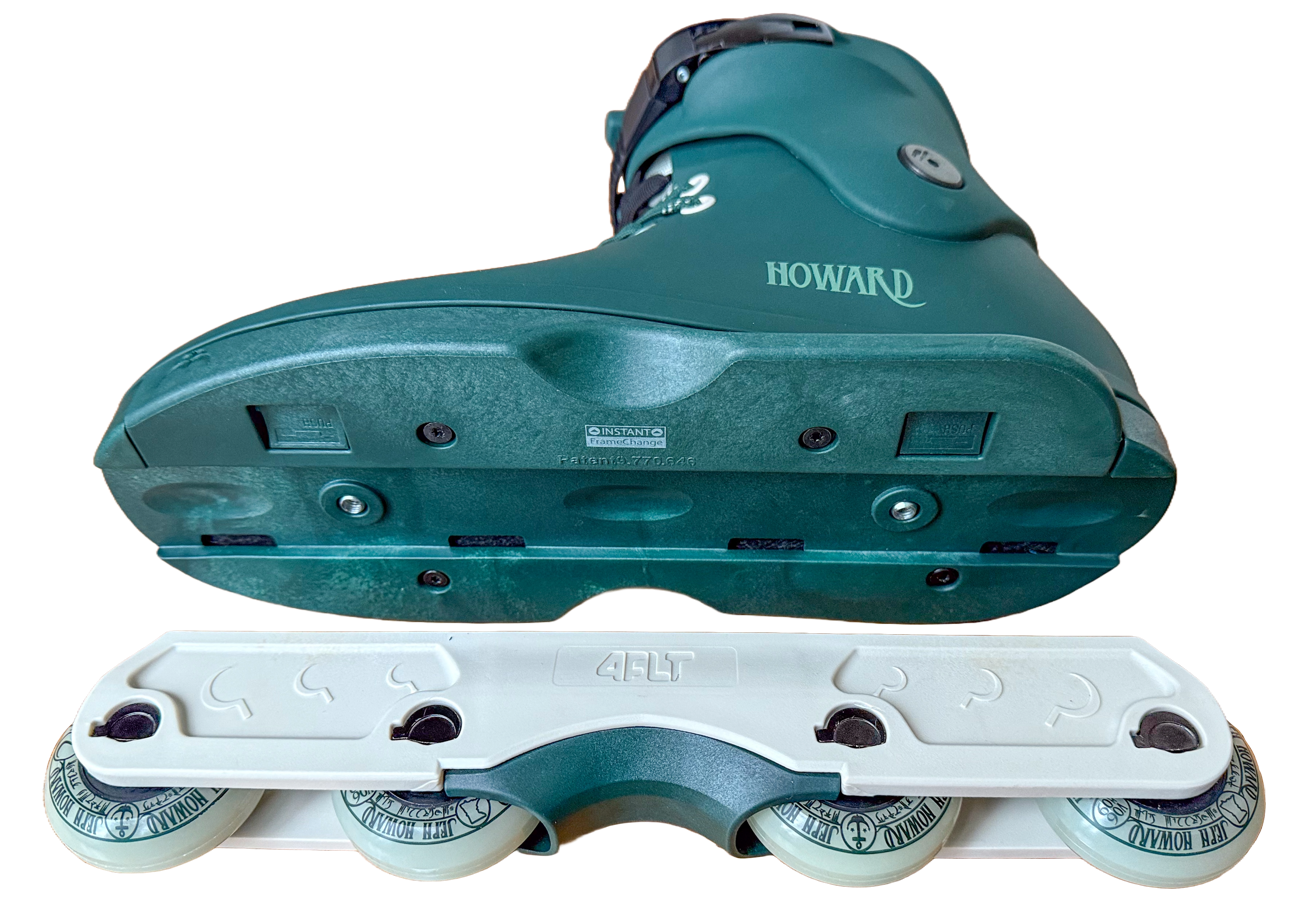
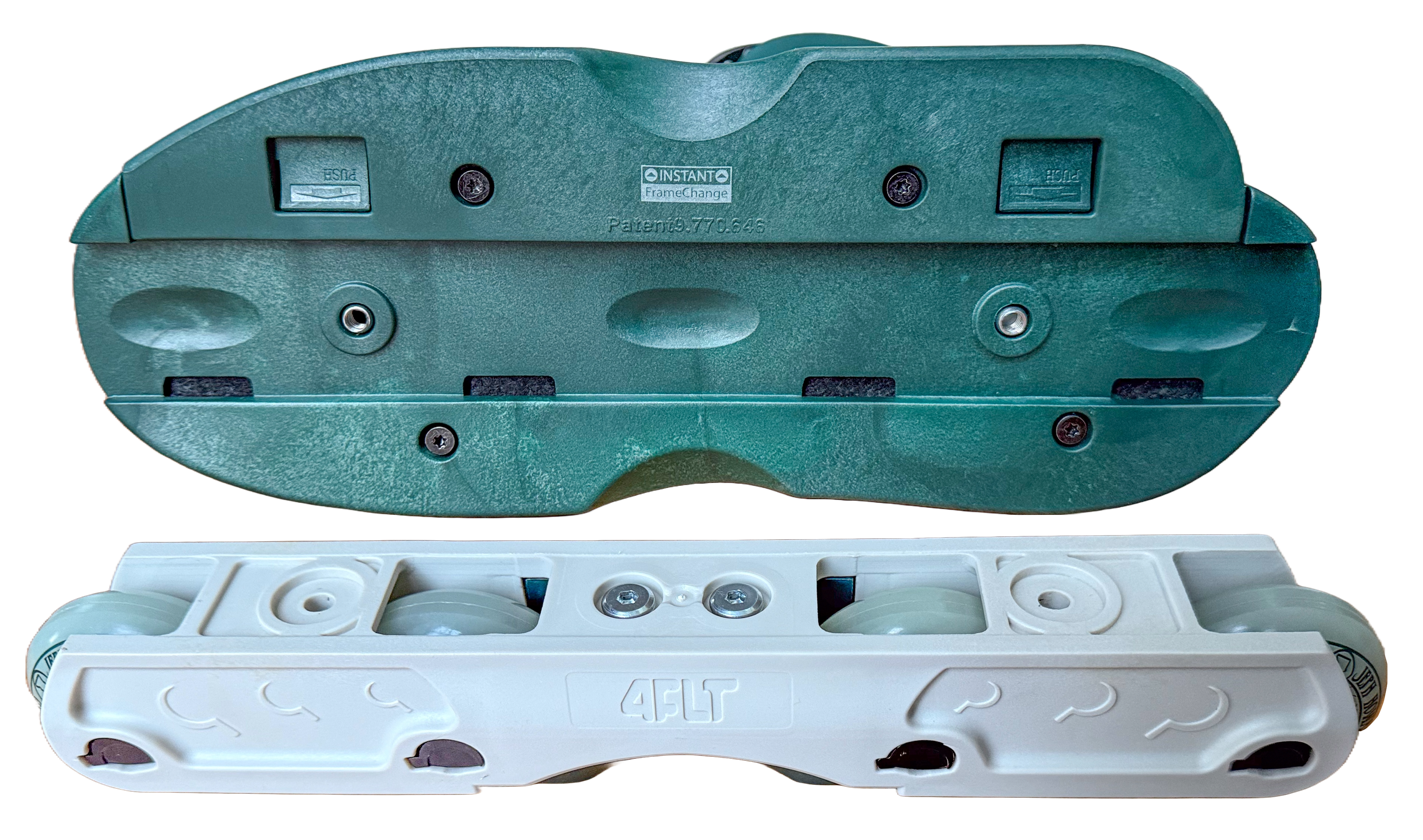
UFS patent drawing (left). Razors Shift - UFS boot and frame (right).

In 1999, Salomon, along with USD, Razors, Kizer, 7XL/Able, and Fifty/50, collaborated to establish a standardized mounting system for aggressive skates: the Universal Frame System (UFS). This standard capitalized on the emerging trend of flat soulplates, requiring a single, flat rectangular mounting surface 41 mm wide and long enough to accommodate two mounting holes spaced 167 mm apart. In 2001, Salomon introduced the Aaron Feinberg Pro Model, the first skate to feature the UFS mounting standard. The model quickly gained popularity and set a new industry benchmark.

Unlike other mounting systems of the time, UFS eliminated built-in heel lift, positioning the heel level with the toes for the first time. However, most brands followed Salomon’s lead in incorporating a thick shock absorber at the heel. This provided better impact support for hard landings from high jumps, but accidentally reintroduced a small amount of heel lift.

== Trinity ==
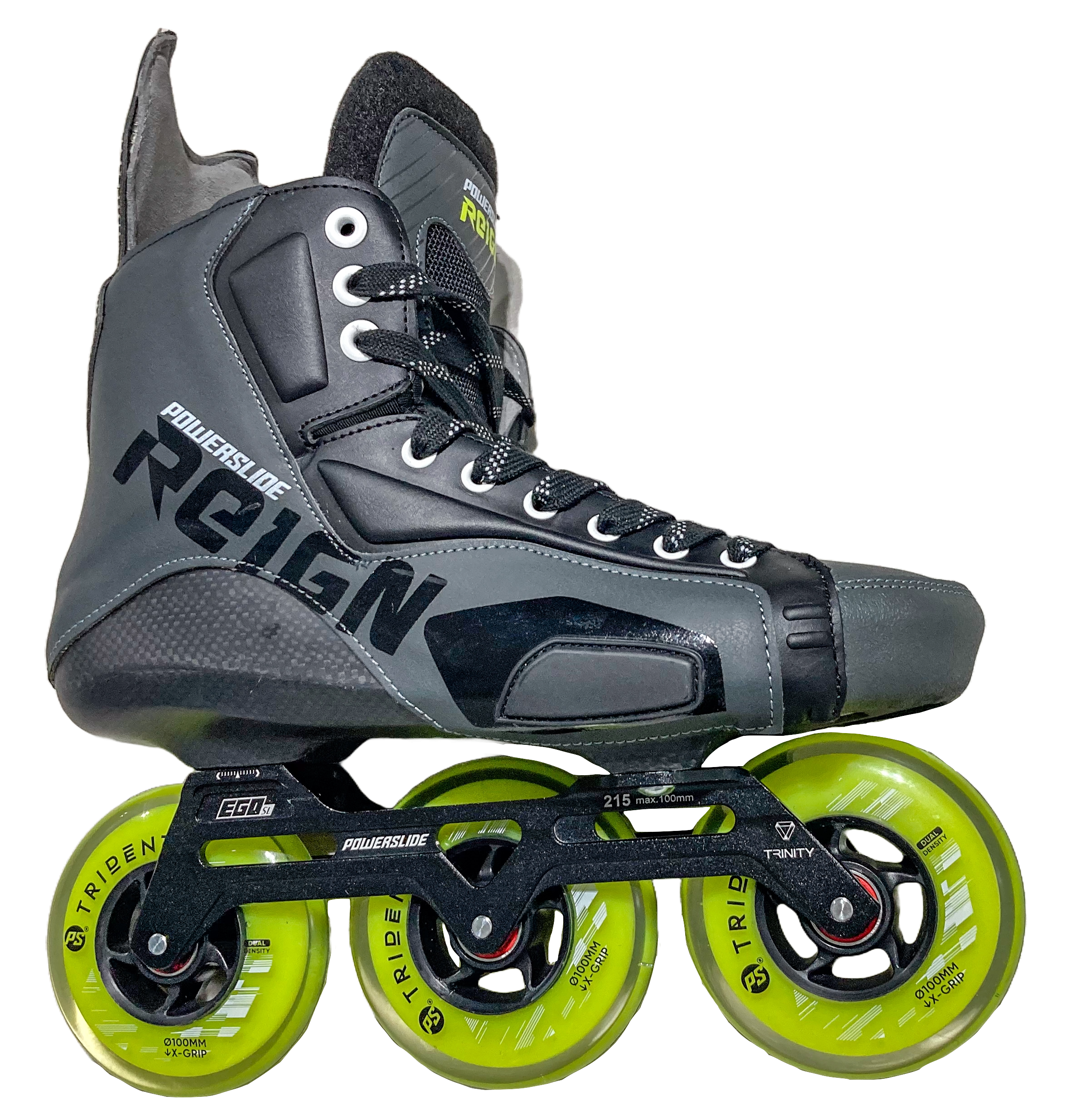

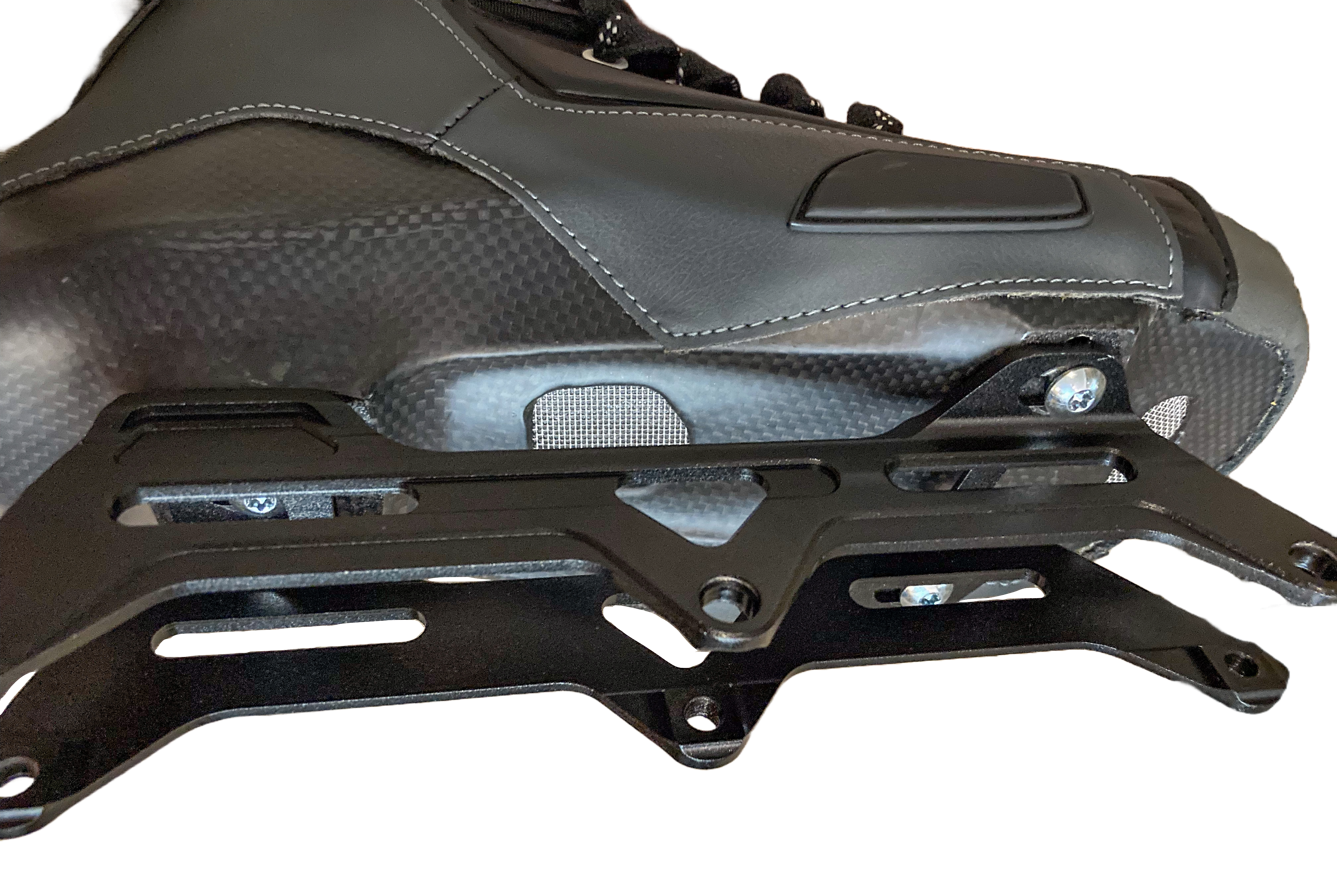
A Trinity boot & frame

The 165mm mounting standard, originally from speed skating, has dominated the inline skate market since the mid-1990s, except in aggressive skates that use UFS mounting and hockey skates that rely on rivets. However, not all inline boots are made from the stiff carbon-composite materials typical of speed boots. The small 165mm mounting area can lead to frame wobbles on boots lacking a rigid sole or reinforced mounting platforms.

As larger wheels gained popularity in the 21st century, 165mm frames evolved to accommodate setups with bigger and sometimes fewer wheels. Some manufacturers increased frame height, which negatively affected stability and performance. Others relocated or downsized middle wheels to avoid interference with mounting bolts. Some brands even shifted the mounting platforms forward or backward to fit specific wheel setups, causing front-to-back centering issues when mixing and matching boots and frames. For instance, Rollerblade Twister and certain Seba boots have unconventional 165mm mount placements, making it difficult or even impossible to achieve proper longitudinal centering with aftermarket frames. To meet demand for these popular boots, Endless Blading released a version of its Endless 100 frame specifically tweaked to fit them.

The 195mm standard, introduced in 2003, better supported larger wheel setups without increasing frame height, relocating middle wheels, downsizing middle wheels, or shifting mounts. However, it also spread the mounting points farther apart – beyond the optimal heel-to-ball length that best supports an average foot. The 195mm standard required exceptionally stiff soles and boots, which were unavailable outside the speed skating market until the late 2010s. As a result, only speed boots made of carbon fiber adopted the 195mm standard.

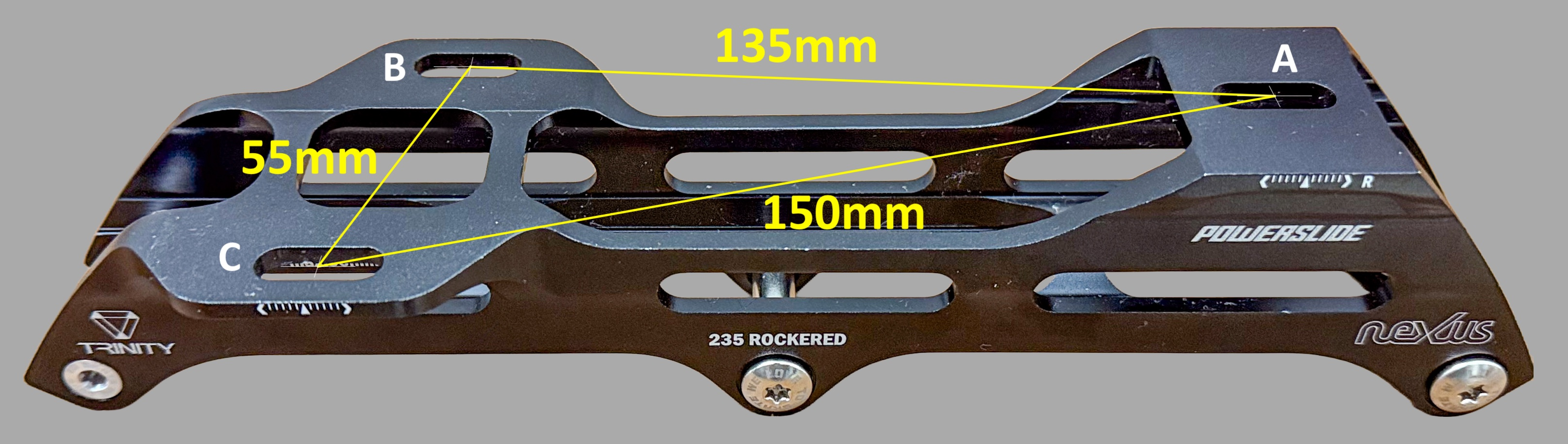
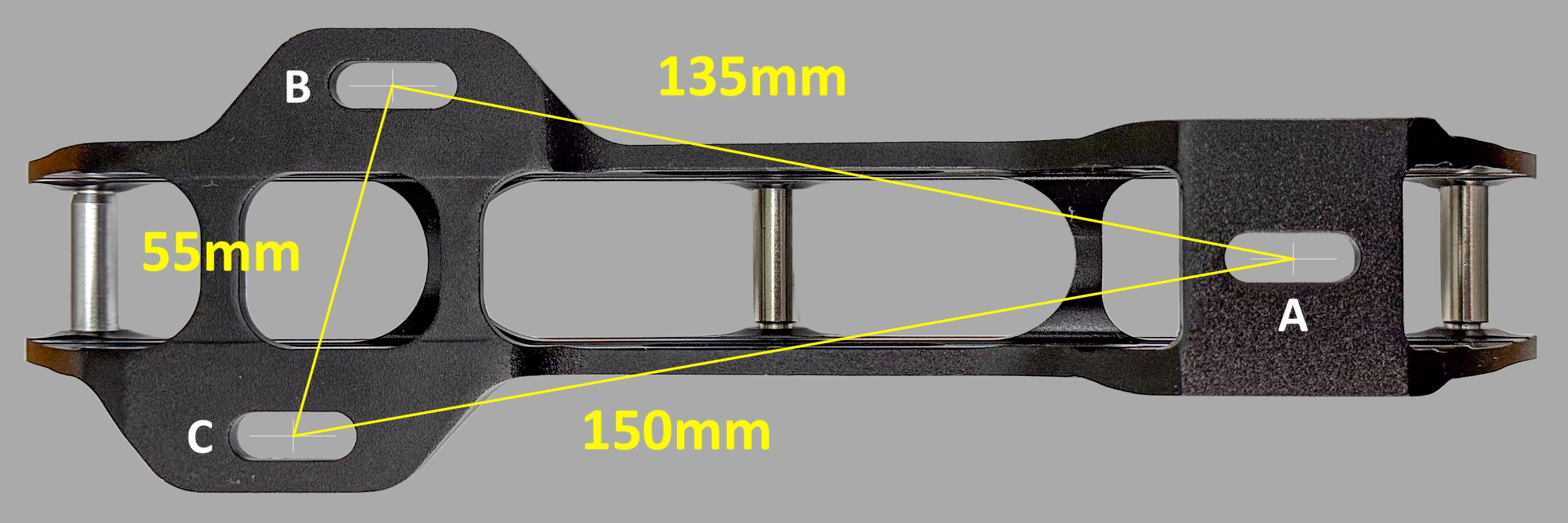

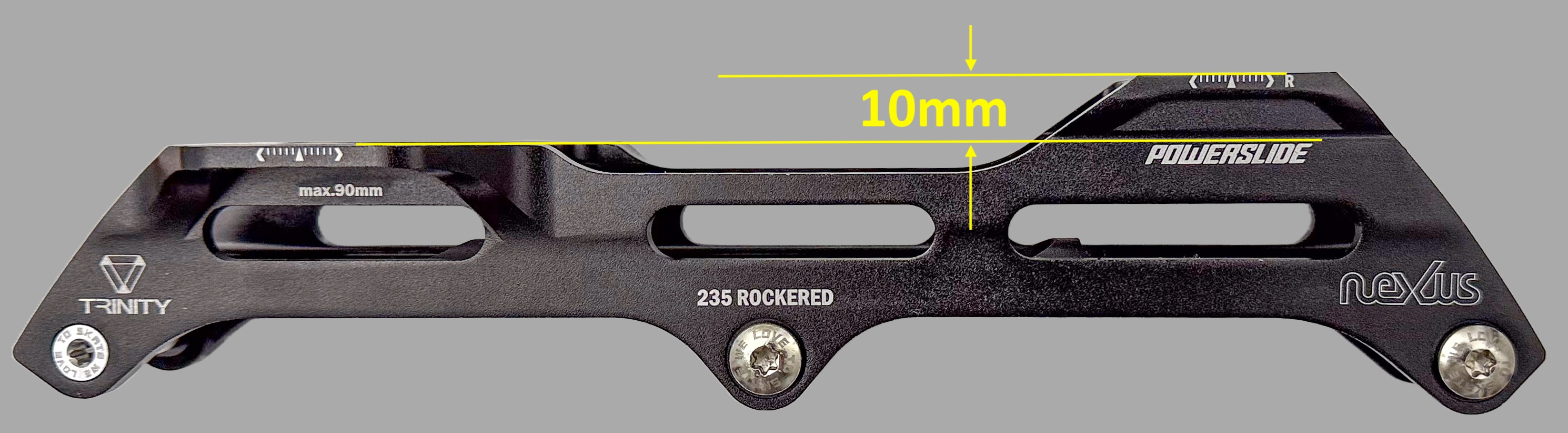
Trinity specifications

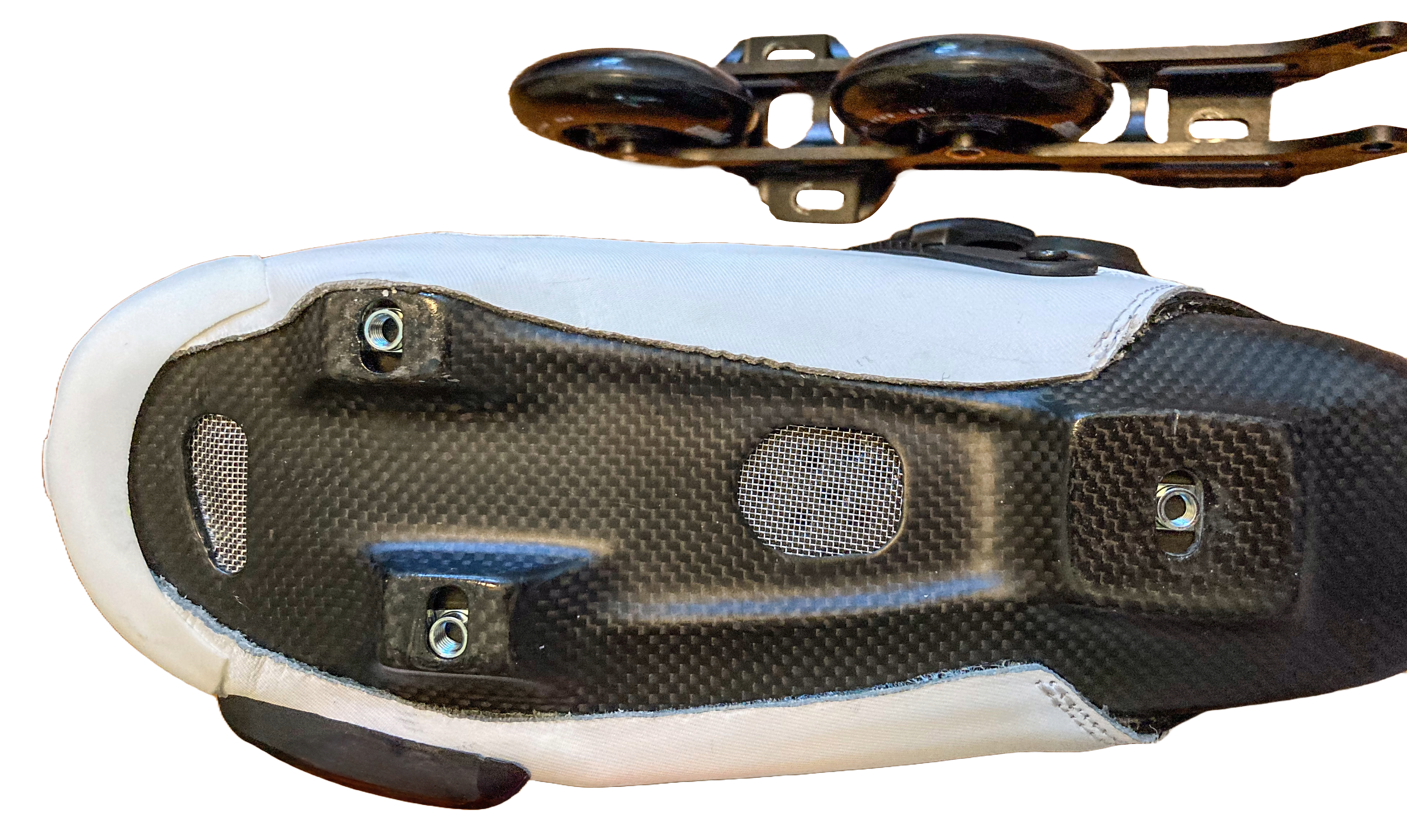
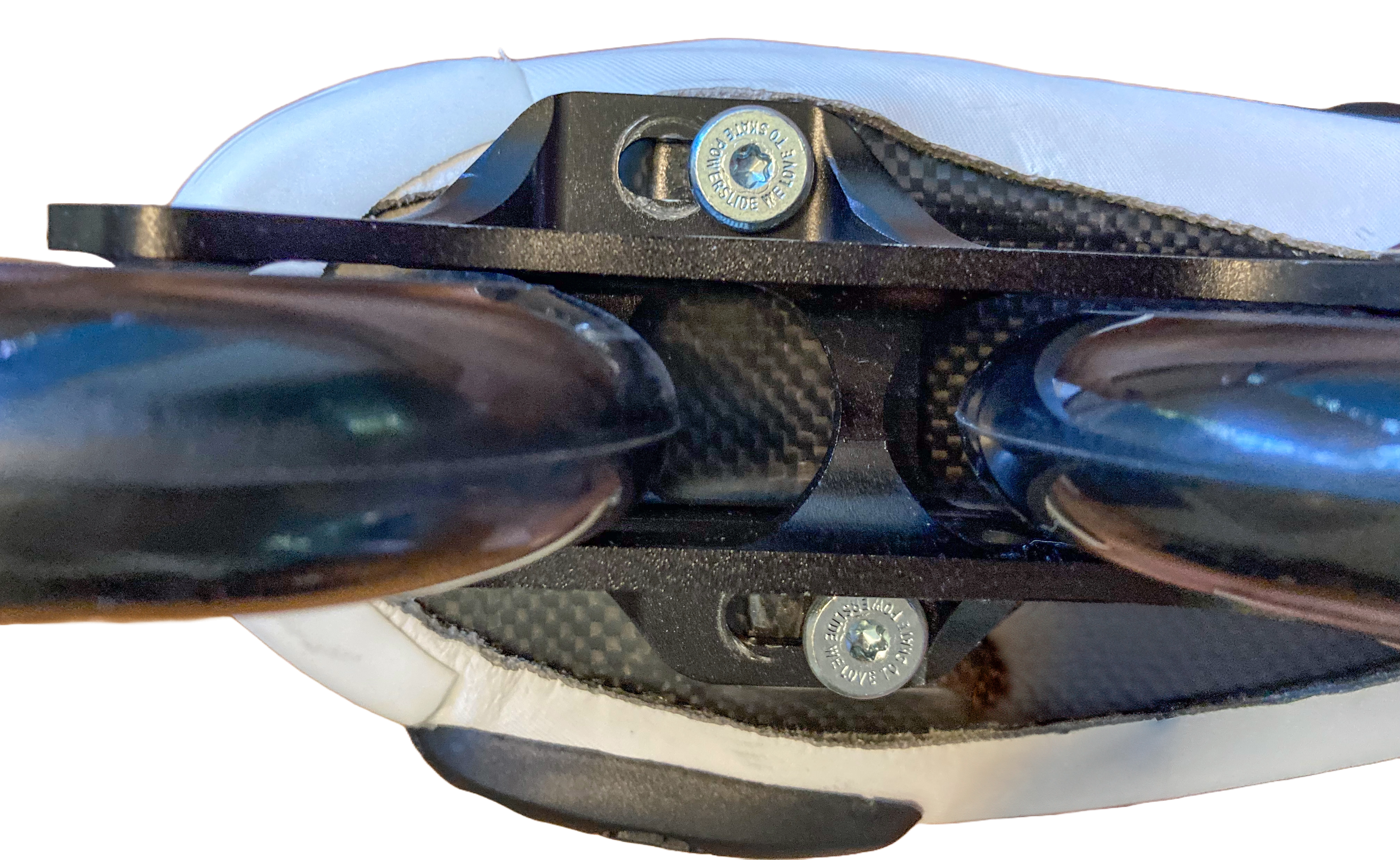
Powerslide Tau boot with Trinity mounts

In 2016, Powerslide introduced the Trinity mounting system to accommodate a wide range of modern wheel setups while addressing the shortcomings of both the 165mm and 195mm standards. Demonstrating its versatility, Powerslide launched Trinity-mounted boots and frames across multiple disciplines, including recreational, urban, speed, slalom, hockey, and off-road skating.

The name "Trinity" reflects its three mounting points, in contrast to the two-point systems used in 165mm, 195mm, and UFS. Trinity features two front mounting points positioned on the sides with a longitudinal offset, avoiding the centerline where the two frontmost wheels are located. The vacated centerline allows front wheels of any size or configuration to be placed within millimeters of the boot sole. The rear mount is elevated by 10 mm, creating a heel lift similar to the 165mm standard. Positioned under the heel and in line with the rear wheels, the rear mounting bolt remains unobtrusive due to the 10 mm rise. The longitudinal offset positions the two front mounts asymmetrically under the medial and lateral sides of the ball of the foot. The three mounting points create a triangular configuration with sides measuring 150 mm, 135 mm, and 55 mm. This design provides structural support tailored to a typical foot, ensuring optimal heel-to-ball alignment.

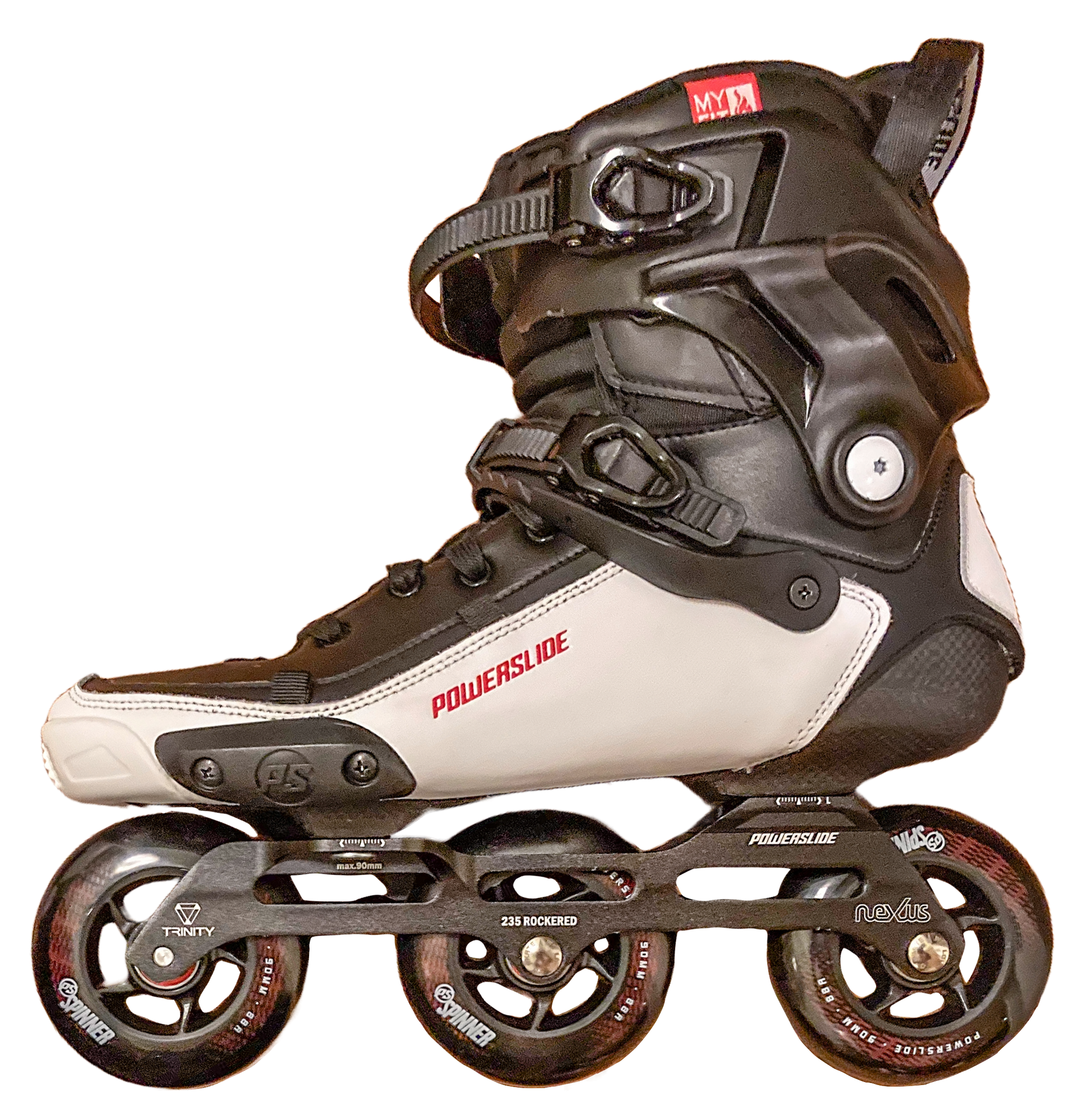
PS Tau boot on factory frame & 90 mm wheels

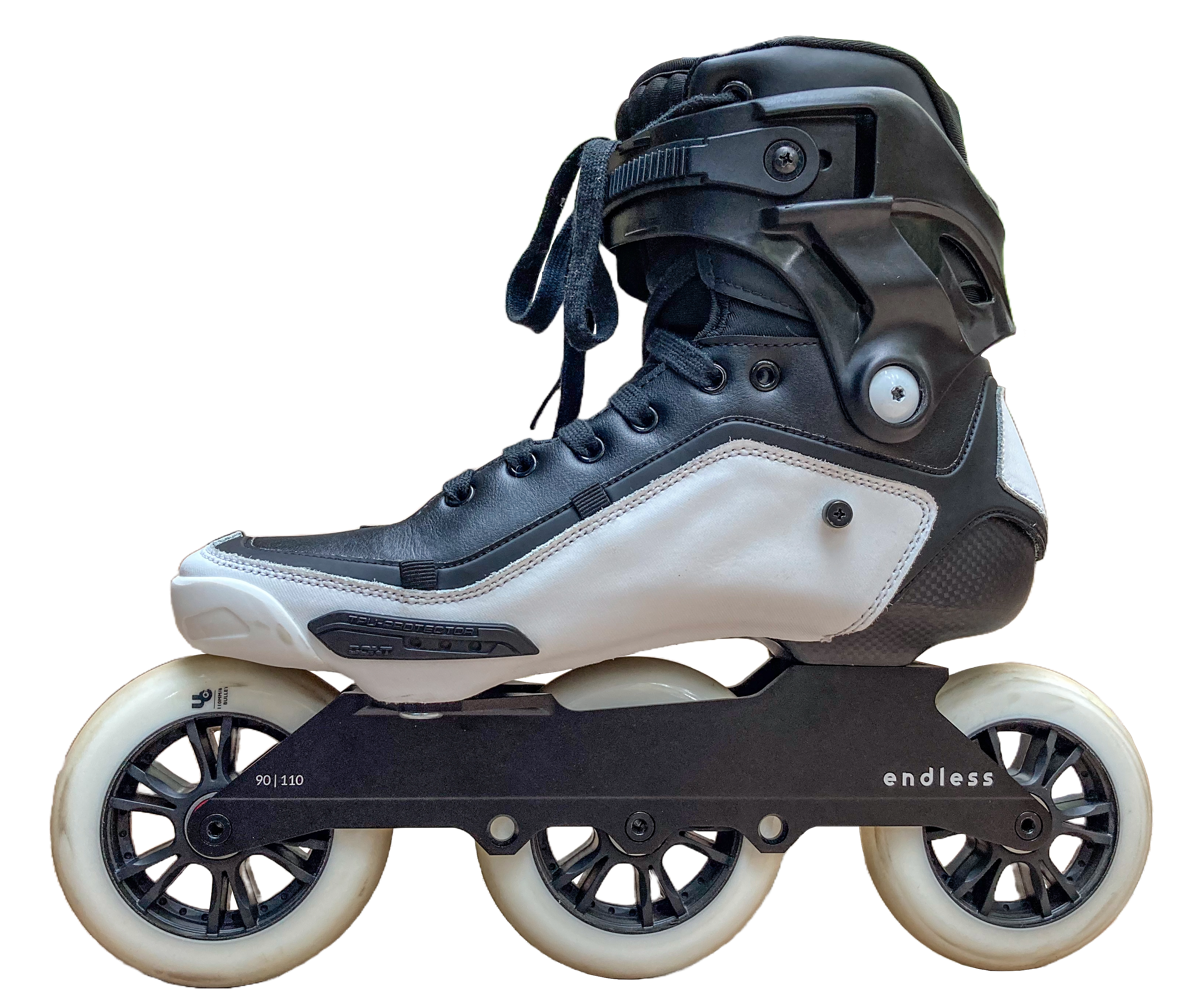
PS Tau boot on aftermarket frame & 110 mm wheels

A Trinity frame generally exhibits less wobble than 165mm and 195mm frames when comparing boots with similar sole rigidity and mounting platform strength. This is because a 165mm frame depends on the boot sole to function as a cantilever beam, with each side extending outward and applying bending forces to the centrally located mounting bolts. In contrast, a Trinity frame distributes structural support across the full width of the ball of the foot, much like a hockey blade holder with two front mounting wings. This broader support reinforces the sole and shortens its effective cantilever length on each side of the boot, resulting in better transfer of power from foot to wheels and support for weight transfer when leaning into an edge.

A Trinity frame typically has a lower "front" mount height than its 165mm counterpart when using the same wheel setup. This is because the front mount of a Trinity frame can be positioned significantly lower than the tops of the front wheels due to its open centerline. However, a reduction in mount height alone is not a meaningful metric for skaters. The true advantage of a Trinity frame lies in its ability to position the front of the boot as close to the ground as the front wheels allow, effectively lowering the skate’s center of gravity. This improves control and stability, resulting in a safer and more responsive skating experience.

== Heel brakes and toe stops ==
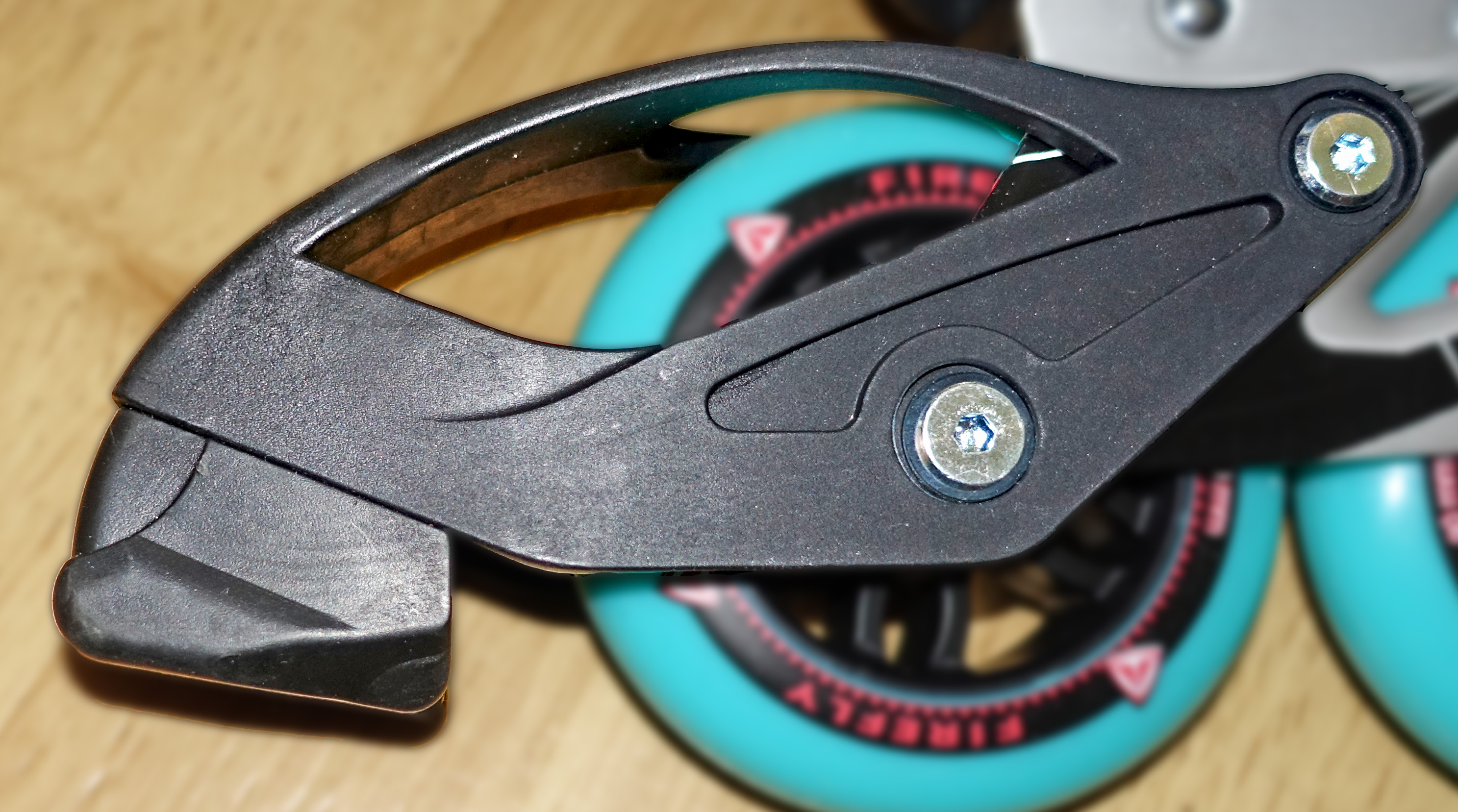
New heel brake

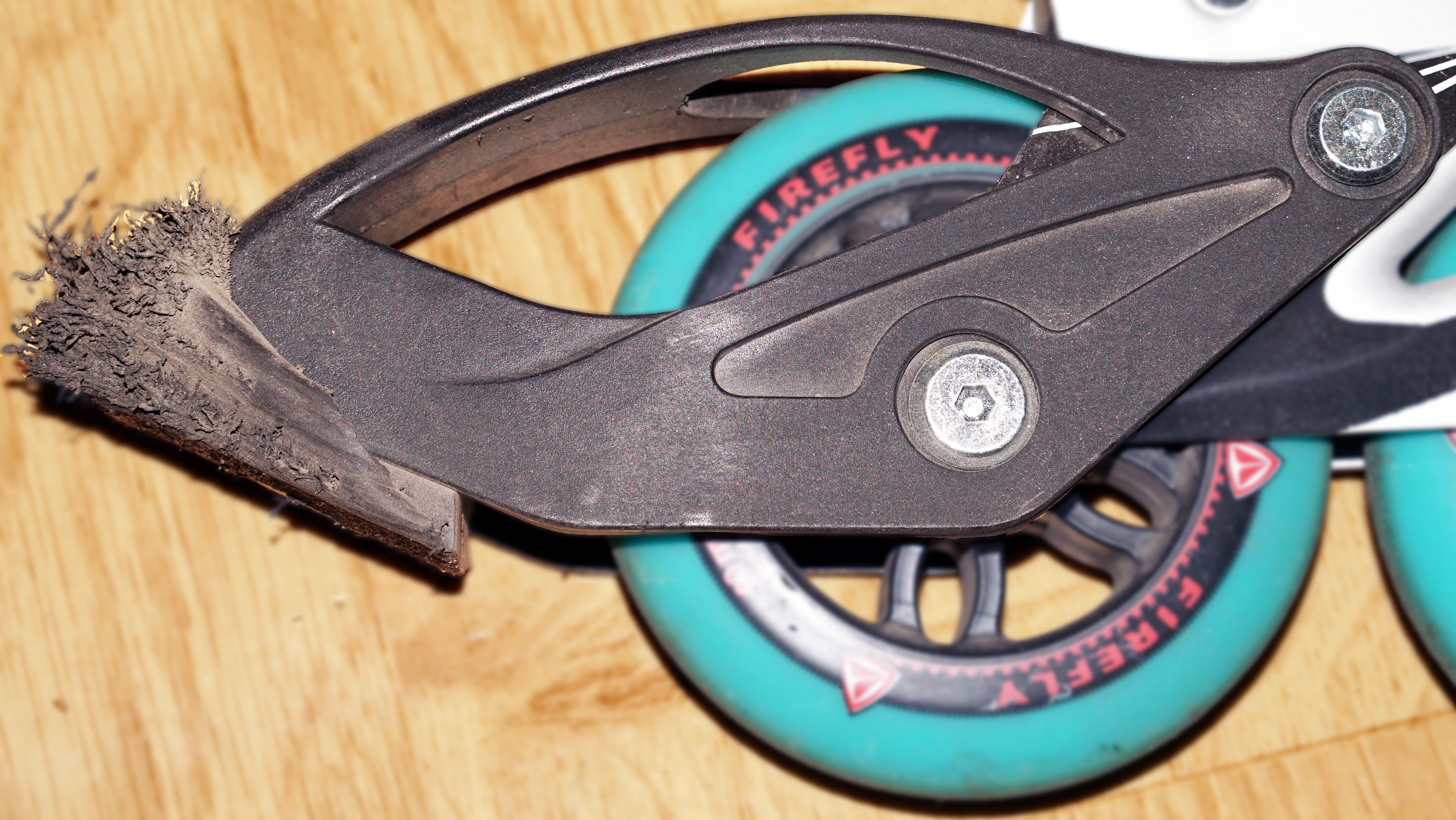
Worn-out heel brake

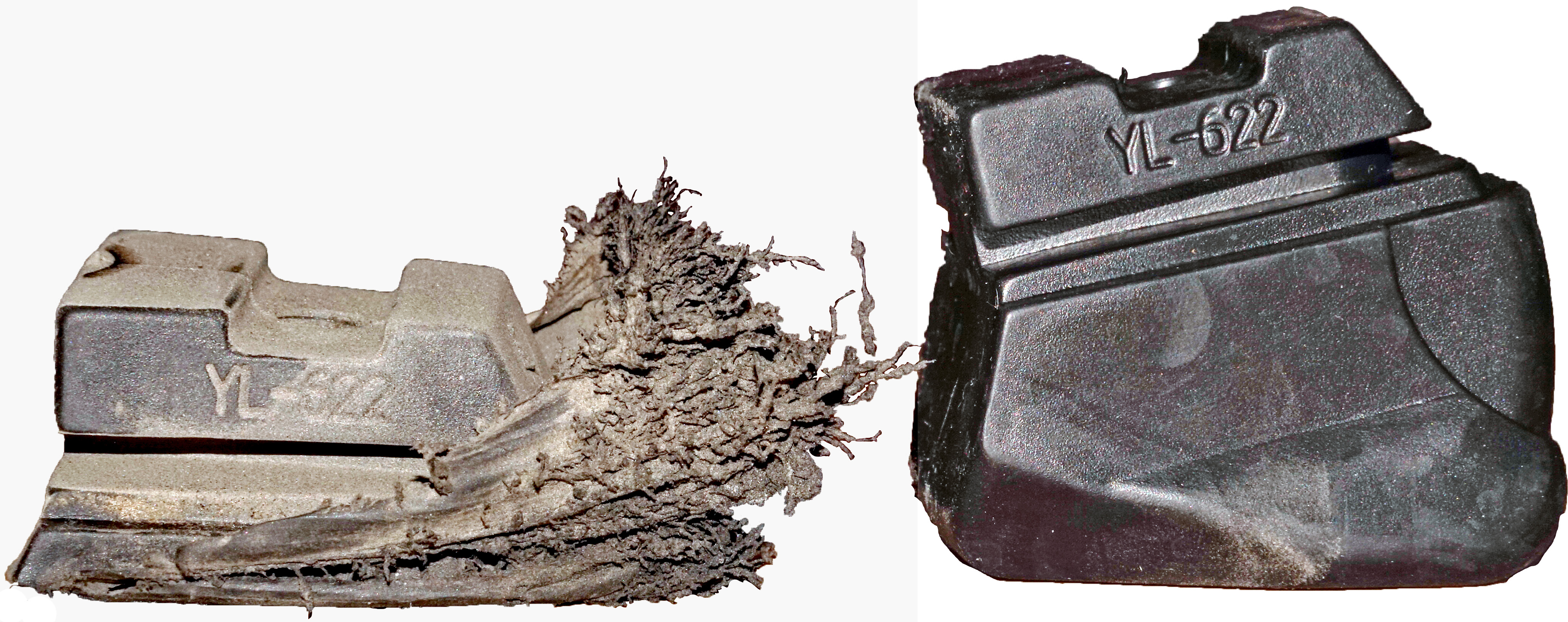
worn-out brake pads can be replaced

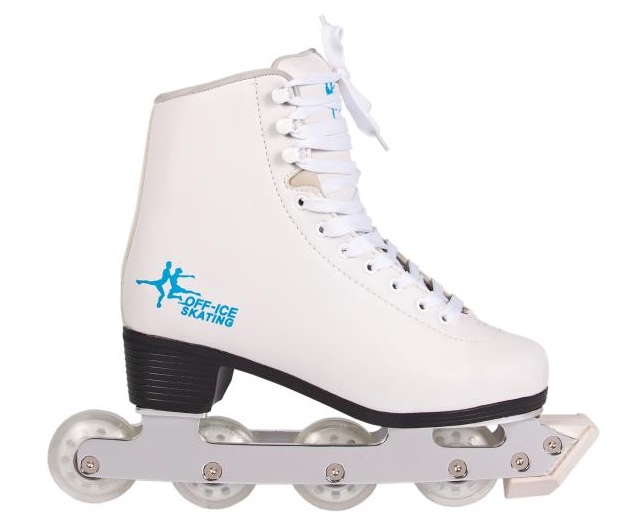
Inline figure skate

A hard rubber brake attached to the heel of the frame, known as a heel brake, allows a skater to stop by lifting the toes of the skate and pressing the brake against the ground. Learning to use the heel brake is crucial for beginners, as it provides the easiest method to stop in emergencies and control speed on downhills. Recreational and fitness skates typically include one brake unit, which can be mounted on either the right or left skate. Most righthanded skaters choose to attach the brake to the right skate.

However, heel brakes can interfere with certain skating techniques. Hockey players and speed racers, for example, rely heavily on crossover turns, where one leg crosses over the other to execute sharp turns without losing speed. In such moves, a heel brake becomes an hindrance. Similarly, heel brakes limit a skater’s ability to perform freestyle slalom tricks and aggressive grinds. For this reason, specialized skates designed for racing, hockey, slalom, and aggressive skating generally do not come equipped with a brake.

Some urban skates come with a brake included in the box but left unattached, while others are not designed to accommodate a brake at all. Many intermediate and advanced skaters eventually remove the brakes from their recreational skates once they master stopping techniques that don't rely on them. Moves such as the T-stop are commonly used to slow down; one skate is placed perpendicular behind the other to form a "T" and increase friction. However, most braking maneuvers like these cause significant wear on wheels by grinding them against the ground. As a result, some skaters prefer to focus on obstacle avoidance using slalom techniques and controlled turns, which minimize wheel wear.

Inline figure skates are unique among inline designs in that they use a toe stop instead of a heel brake. Toe stops are essential for performing many artistic roller skating moves and jumps.
