= Low plasticity burnishing =

Low plasticity burnishing (LPB) cold compresses metal to provide deep, stable surface residual stresses to improve damage tolerance and extend metal fatigue life; mitigating surface damage, including fretting, corrosion pitting, stress corrosion cracking (SCC), and foreign object damage (FOD). Improved fretting fatigue and stress corrosion performance has been documented, even at elevated temperatures where the compression from other metal improvement processes: low stress grinding (LSG) etc. relax. The resulting deep layer of compressive residual stress has also been shown to improve high cycle fatigue (HCF), low cycle fatigue (LCF), and stress corrosion cracking (SCC) performance.

LPB is the only known metal improvement method applied under continuous closed-loop process control and has been successfully applied to turbine engines, piston engines, propellers, aging aircraft structures, landing gear, nuclear waste material containers, biomedical implants, armaments, fitness equipment and welded joints. Typical applications involve titanium, iron, nickel and steel-based components which showed improved damage tolerance as well as HCF and LCF performance by an order of magnitude over existing metal improvement processes.

== History ==
Low plasticity burnishing was invented and patented by Lambda Research, Inc., part of the Lambda Technologies Group, in Cincinnati, Ohio in 1996. The first patent on the process was issued in 1998. LPB® was later trademarked by Surface Technology Holdings, also part of the Lambda Technologies Group. As of 2025, Lambda Technologies Group is the only provider of LPB® in the world.

== How it works ==
The basic LPB tool is a ball, wheel or other similar tip supported in a spherical hydrostatic bearing held in a CNC machine or industrial robot, depending on the application. Continuous coolant flow pressurizes the LPB tool bearing to support the ball. The ball does not contact the mechanical bearing seat, even under load. The ball is loaded at a normal state to the surface of a component with a hydraulic cylinder that is in the body of the tool. LPB can be performed in conjunction with chip forming machining operations in the same CNC machining tool.

The ball rolls across the surface of a component in a pattern defined in the CNC code, as in any machining operation. The tool path and normal pressure applied are designed to create a distribution of compressive residual stress. The form of the distribution is designed to counter applied stresses and optimize fatigue and stress corrosion performance. Since there is no shear being applied to the ball, it is free to roll in any direction. As the ball rolls over the component, the pressure from the ball causes plastic deformation to occur in the surface of the material under the ball. Since the bulk of the material constrains the deformed area, the deformed zone is left in compression after the ball passes.

== Benefits ==
1. With this practice of customization along with the closed-loop process control system, LPB has been shown to produce a maximum compression of 12mm, although the average is around 1-7+mm.
2. LPB has even been shown to have the ability to produce through-thickness compression in blades and vanes, greatly increasing their damage tolerance over 10-fold, effectively mitigating most FOD and reducing inspection requirements.
3. No material is removed during this process, even when correcting corrosion damage.
4. LPB smooths surface asperities during machining, leaving an improved, almost mirror-like surface finish that is vastly better looking and better protected than even a newly manufactured component.

== Cold working ==
The cold work temperature produced from this process is typically minimal; similar to the cold work produced by laser peening, but a great deal less than shot peening, gravity peening or, deep rolling. Cold work is particularly important because the higher the cold work temperatures at the surface of a component, the more vulnerable to elevated temperatures and mechanical overload that component will be and the easier the beneficial surface residual compression will relax, rendering the treatment pointless. In other words, a highly cold worked component will not hold compression if it comes into contact with extreme heat, like an engine, and will be just as vulnerable to damage without cold working. Therefore, LPB and laser peening stand out in the surface enhancement industry because both are thermally stable at high temperatures. The reason LPB produces such low percentages of cold work is because of the aforementioned closed-loop process control. Conventional shot peening processes have some guesswork on complete component coverage and are not exact at all, causing the procedure to be performed multiple times on one component to ensure adequate cold work. For example, shot peening, in order to make sure every spot on the component is treated, typically specifies coverage of between 200% (2T) and 400% (4T). This means that at 200% coverage (2T), 5 or more impacts occur at 84% of locations and at 400% coverage (4T), it is significantly more. One problem is that one area will be hit several times while the area next to may be hit fewer times, leaving uneven compression at the surface; resulting in the whole process being unstable and easily “undone”, as mentioned above. LPB requires only one pass with the tool and leaves a deep, even, stable compressive stress.

The LPB process can be performed on-site in the shop or in situ using robots, making it easy to incorporate into everyday maintenance and manufacturing procedures. The method is applied under continuous closed loop process control (CLPC), creating accuracy within 0.1% and alerting the operator and QA immediately if the processing bounds are exceeded. One issue of this process is that different CNC processing codes need to be developed for each application, just like other machining tasks. Another potential issue is that because of dimensional restrictions, it may not be possible to create the tools necessary to work on certain geometries, although this has yet to be a problem.

== See also ==
- Corrosion fatigue
- Damage tolerance
- FOD
- Fretting
- High Frequency Impact Treatment aftertreatment of weld transitions
- Laser peening
- Metal fatigue
- Peening
- Residual stress
- Shot peening
- Stress corrosion cracking
- Ultrasonic impact treatment
