= MIC =

Mic or MIC may refer to:

- Microphone, an acoustic transducer

== Places ==
- Federated States of Micronesia, UNDP country code
- Metlakatla Indian Community, Annette Island Reserve, federally recognized tribe and reservaton in Alaska
- Miami Intermodal Center, a mega-transportation hub in Miami, Florida

== People ==
- Mic (name), numerous people

== Arts, entertainment, and media ==
- M.I.C. (band), a Chinese band formed by Taihe Rye Music
- Mic (media company), a media company focused on news for millennials
- Mic, an abbreviation for referencing the Book of Micah
- Made in Chelsea, a television series

== Organizations ==
=== Business ===
- Metal Improvement Company, a company specializing in metal surface treatments
- Merida Industry Co., Ltd., a bicycle manufacturing company in Taiwan
- Military Industries Corporation (Saudi Arabia), the main armament industry for the Saudi military
- Military Industry Corporation, the main armament industry for the Sudanese military
- Myanmar Investment Commission, a government-appointed body
- Mortgage investment corporation, a Canadian investment and lending company
- Motorcycle Industry Council, an American non-profit trade association
- MIC (organization), a Russian construction organization

=== Government and politics ===
- Malaysian Indian Congress, a Malaysian political party
- Military–industrial complex, the relationship between a nation's military forces, its arms industry, and government
- Military Intelligence Corps (Sri Lanka), a Sri Lankan military corp that is responsible for gathering, analyzing, and distributing military intelligence
- Military Intelligence Corps (United States Army), the intelligence branch of the United States Army, responsible for gathering, analyzing, and distributing military intelligence
- Ministry of Information and Communication (South Korea), a government agency
- Ministry of Internal Affairs and Communications, a Japanese government agency
- Ministry of Culture (Italy) (MiC), an Italian government agency dedicated to museums and the arts

=== Other organizations ===
- Marians of the Immaculate Conception, a Roman Catholic clerical congregation
- Mary Immaculate College, a college in Limerick, Ireland
- Metropolitan Interscholastic Conference, a high school athletic conference in Indiana, United States
- Midwest Independent Conference, United States, NCAA women's gymnastics conference
- Multan Institute of Cardiology, Pakistan

== Science and medicine ==
- Major immunogene complex, gene complex coding immune response
- Maximal information coefficient, a statistical measure of association between variables
- Medical image computing, an interdisciplinary field
- Metal-induced crystallization, a method for turning amorphous silicon into polycrystalline silicon
- Metastable intermolecular composite, a type of reactive material in explosives research
- Methyl isocyanate, a chemical compound used in pesticides
- Microbial corrosion, or microbially-induced corrosion, corrosion caused or promoted by microorganisms
- Microscopium (constellation), abbreviation Mic
- Minimum inhibitory concentration, in microbiology, the lowest concentration of an antimicrobial that will inhibit growth of a microorganism
- Morbus ischaemicus cordis, Latin for coronary artery disease
- Medically induced coma

== Technology ==
- Machine Identification Code, a watermark generated by some printers
- Mandatory Integrity Control, a new security feature in Microsoft Windows Vista
- Intel MIC, Intel's Many Integrated Core processor architecture
- Media Interface Connector, for fiber optics
- Message Integrity Code, a cryptographic checksum used in wireless communications
- Micrometer (device), a measuring tool
- Microscope, an instrument for optical magnification
- Microsoft Innovation Center, Microsoft partners
- Microwave integrated circuit, a type of integrated circuit

== Other uses ==
- Market Identifier Code, or ISO 10383, a unique identification code, which serves as a standard to identify securities trading exchanges, regulated and non-regulated trading markets
- Mi'kmaq language, by ISO 639 alpha-2 language code
- Middle income country, a developing country
- Crystal Airport (Minnesota), by IATA code

== See also ==
- MICS (disambiguation)
- Microphone (disambiguation)
