= Metal Improvement Company =

Metal Improvement Company LLC, part of Curtiss-Wright, is a company specializing in metal surface treatments.

MIC provides multiple technical services for the metal treatment industry, including thermal spray, solid film lubricant and parylene coatings, and materials testing services; but is best known for its legacy shot peening technology, which can enhance the performance of metal components, preventing premature fatigue and corrosion failures.

== History ==
The company was founded in 1945 in southern California by engineer Henry Fuchs. Fuchs had been working with John Almen on new applications for shot peening of automobiles and military equipment companies produced before and during World War II. Fuchs and Almen worked at the Research Laboratory of General Motors Corporation before the start of MIC. The Almen strip or Almen system, a tool for duplicating the shot peening process, was named after John Almen.

Fuchs started in his garage accompanied by his son-in-law, Fred Landecker. The aircraft industry first began to use the shot peening processes.

Henry Fuchs died in 1989. He was a Professor Emeritus of Stanford University. The Society of Automotive Engineers named an award "Henry O. Fuchs" in his honor.

In the 1950s, the company worked on the wing skins of Lockheed Super Constellation aircraft and the Douglas DC-3 aircraft. In 1968 the company was acquired by Curtiss-Wright which had begun an expansion program at its Buffalo extrusion facility, adding new forging and machining equipment for building aircraft and aerospace components.

At the end of the 1990s Lawrence Livermore Laboratories, working under a government contract for a laser to illuminate passing satellites, developed a process of peening with light with enough power to use it also for commercial purposes. Metal Improvement Company, under a CRADA agreement with Lawrence Livermore Laboratories, began to develop this technology for commercial customers and in 2003 the company introduced the laser peening to the market. In 2006 NASA worked with the company, and they together presented a study called: "Effects of Laser Peening, and Shot Peening on Friction Stir Welding".
