= SAE J445 =

SAE laboratory test report for metallic shot and grit

- Metallic Shot and Grit Mechanical Testing
- Abbreviation: SAE J445
- Status: Published
- First published: 1984
- Latest version: 2022
- Organization: SAE International
- Domain: Shot peening, abrasive blasting

J445 is an SAE standard that specifies laboratory methods for characterising metallic shot and grit, used as blast media in shot peening and blast cleaning. The methods are used to compare media durability and the energy transmitted during impact with standardised bench equipment.

== Specifications and test methods ==
In the tests specified by J445, a weighed and sieved sample of metallic shot or grit is propelled repeatedly against a hardened target and then re-sieved at fixed intervals to measure breakdown and loss.

The standard describes several methods for calculating the average life (the number of cycles to break down) of the shot or grit from the test results. The average life may be calculated from the area under the breakdown curve, by a stabilised loss-rate method, or by the number of cycles required to completely replace the initial sample placed in the machine.

The energy transmitted by the shot or grit is evaluated by positioning an Almen A strip in the impact path of the blast media. After a set number of cycles, the resulting arc height of the strip is measured and indicates the transmitted energy.

The standard document notes that the results of controlled laboratory tests do not necessarily reflect the performance of blast media in production conditions. The tests specified in J445 may still be used for quality control, however, by comparing new batches of shot or grit with the results for previous batches.

== Similar standards ==
The ISO has published ISO 11125-9, which also defines standardized methods for testing blast media service life and cleaning performance, based on the kinetic energy transmitted to the substrate in the cleaning process.
