= Laser peening =

Surface engineering process

Laser peening (LP), or laser shock peening (LSP), is a surface-engineering process used to impart beneficial residual stresses in materials. The deep, high-magnitude compressive residual stresses induced by laser peening increase the resistance of materials to surface-related failures, such as fatigue, fretting fatigue, and stress corrosion cracking. Laser shock peening can also be used to strengthen thin sections, harden surfaces, shape or straighten parts (known as laser peen forming), break up hard materials, compact powdered metals, and for other applications where high-pressure, short-duration shock waves offer desirable processing results.

== History ==
=== Discovery and development (1960s) ===
Initial scientific discoveries towards modern-day laser peening began in the early 1960s as pulsed-laser technology began to proliferate around the world. In an early investigation of laser interaction with materials by Gurgen Askaryan and E.M. Moroz, they documented pressure measurements on a targeted surface using a pulsed laser. The pressures observed were much larger than could be created by the force of the laser beam alone. Research into the phenomenon indicated the high pressure resulted from a momentum impulse generated by material vaporization at the target surface when rapidly heated by the laser pulse (laser ablation). Throughout the 1960s, a number of investigators further defined and modeled the laser beam pulse interaction with materials and the subsequent generation of stress waves. These and other studies, observed that stress waves in the material were generated from the rapidly-expanding plasma created when the pulsed laser beam struck the target. Subsequently, this led to interest in achieving higher pressures to increase the stress-wave intensity. To generate higher pressures, it was necessary to increase the power density and focus the laser beam (concentrate the energy), requiring that the laser beam–material interaction occur in a vacuum chamber to avoid dielectric breakdown within the beam in air. These constraints limited study of high-intensity pulsed laser–material interactions to a select group of researchers with high-energy pulsed lasers.

In the late 1960s a major breakthrough occurred when N.C. Anderholm discovered that much higher plasma pressures could be achieved by confining the expanding plasma against the target surface. Anderholm confined the plasma by placing a quartz overlay, transparent to the laser beam, firmly against the target surface. With the overlay in place, the laser beam passed through the quartz before interacting with the target surface. The rapidly expanding plasma was now confined within the interface between the quartz overlay and the target surface. This method of confining the plasma greatly increased the resulting pressure, generating pressure peaks of 1 to 8 gigapascals (150 to 1,200 ksi), over an order of magnitude greater than unconfined plasma pressure measurements. The significance of Anderholm's discovery to laser peening was the demonstration that pulsed laser–material interactions to develop high-pressure stress waves could be performed in air, not constrained to a vacuum chamber.

=== Laser shocking as a metallurgical process (1970s) ===
The beginning of the 1970s saw the first investigations of the effects of pulsed laser irradiation within the target material. L.I. Mirkin observed twinning in ferrite grains in steel under the crater created by laser irradiation in vacuum. S.A. Metz and F.A. Smidt, Jr., irradiated nickel and vanadium foils in air with a pulsed laser at a low power density and observed voids and vacancy loops after annealing the foils, suggesting that a high concentration of vacancies was created by the stress wave. These vacancies subsequently aggregated during post-iradiation annealing into the observed voids in nickel and dislocation loops in vanadium.

In 1971, researchers at Battelle Memorial Institute in Columbus, Ohio, began investigating whether the laser shocking process could improve metal mechanical properties using a high-energy pulsed laser. In 1972, the first documentation of the beneficial effects of laser-shocking metals was published, reporting the strengthening of aluminum tensile specimens using a quartz overlay to confine the plasma. Subsequently, the first patent on laser shock peening was granted to Phillip Mallozzi and Barry Fairand in 1974. Research into the effects and possible applications of laser peening continued throughout the 1970s and early 1980s by Allan Clauer, Barry Fairand, and coworkers, supported by funding from the National Science Foundation, NASA, Army Research Office, US Air Force, and internally by Battelle. This research explored the in-material effects in more depth and demonstrated the creation of deep compressive stresses and the accompanying increase in fatigue and fretting fatigue life achieved by laser peening.

=== Practical laser peening (1980s) ===
Laser shocking during the initial development stages was severely limited by the laser technology of the time period. The pulsed laser used by Battelle encompassed one large room and required several minutes of recovery time between laser pulses. To become a viable, economical, and practical industrial process, laser technology had to mature into equipment with a much smaller footprint and be capable of increased pulse frequencies. In the early 1980s, Wagner Castings Company located in Decatur, Illinois, became interested in laser peening as a process that could potentially increase the fatigue strength of cast iron to compete with steel, but at a lower cost. Laser peening of various cast irons showed modest fatigue-life improvement, and these results (along with others) convinced them to fund the design and construction of a pre-prototype pulsed laser in 1986 to demonstrate the industrial viability of the process. This laser was completed and demonstrated in 1987. Although the technology had been under investigation and development for about 15 years, few people in industry had heard of it. So, with the completion of the demonstration laser, a major marketing effort was launched by Wagner Castings and Battelle engineers to introduce laser peening to potential industrial markets.

Also in the mid 1980s, Remy Fabbro of the Ecole Polytechnique was initiating a laser shock peening program in Paris. He and Jean Fournier of the Peugeot Company visited Battelle in 1986 for an extended discussion of laser shock peening with Allan Clauer. The programs initiated by Fabbro and carried forward in the 1990s and early 2000s by Patrice Peyre, Laurent Berthe, and co-workers have made major contributions, both theoretical and experimental, to the understanding and implementation of laser peening. In 1998, they measured using VISAR (Velocimeter Interferometer System for Any Reflector) pressure loadings in water confinement as function of wavelength. They demonstrate the detrimental effect of breakdown in water limiting maximum pressure at the surface of material.

=== Creation of an industry (1990s) ===
In the early 1990s, the market was becoming more familiar with the potential of laser peening to increase fatigue life. In 1991, the US Air Force introduced Battelle and Wagner engineers to GE Aviation to discuss the potential application of laser peening to address a foreign object damage (FOD) problem with fan blades in the General Electric F101 engine powering the Rockwell B-1B Lancer bomber. The resulting tests showed that laser-peened fan blades that were severely notched after laser peening had the same fatigue life as a new blade. After further development, GE Aviation licensed the laser shock peening technology from Battelle, and in 1995, GE Aviation and the US Air Force made the decision to move forward with production development of the technology. GE Aviation began production laser peening of the F101 fan blades in 1998.

The demand for industrial laser systems required for GE Aviation to go into production attracted several of the laser shock peening team at Battelle to start LSP Technologies, Inc., in 1995 as the first commercial supplier of laser-peening equipment. Led by founder Jeff Dulaney, LSP Technologies designed and built the laser systems for GE Aviation to perform production laser peening of the F101 fan blades. Through the late 1990s and early 2000s, the US Air Force continued to work with LSP Technologies to mature the laser shock peening production capabilities and implement production manufacturing cells.

In the mid 1990s, independent of the laser-peening developments ongoing in the United States and France, Yuji Sano of the Toshiba Corporation in Japan initiated the development of a laser-peening system capable of laser peening welds in nuclear plant pressure vessels to mitigate stress corrosion cracking in these areas. The system used a low-energy pulsed laser operating at a higher pulse frequency than the higher-powered lasers. The laser beam was introduced into the pressure vessels through articulated tubes. Because the pressure vessels were filled with water, the process did not require a water overlay over the irradiated surface. However, the beam had to travel some distance through the water, necessitating using a shorter wavelength beam, 532 nm, to minimize dielectric breakdown of the beam in the water, instead of the 1054 nm beam used in the United States and France. Also, it was impractical to consider using an opaque overlay. This process is now known as laser peening without coating (LPwC). It began to be applied to Japanese boiling-water and pressurized-water reactors in 1999.

Also in the 1990s a significant laser-peening research group was formed at the Madrid Polytechnic University by José Ocaña. Their work includes both experimental and theoretical studies using low-energy pulsed lasers both with and without an opaque overlay.

=== Supplier foundation and industry growth (1990s – 2000s) ===
With the major breakthrough of commercial application of laser peening on the F101 engine to resolve a major operational problem, laser peening attracted attention around the globe. Researchers in many countries and industries undertook investigations to extend understanding of the laser shock peening process and material property effects. As a result, a large volume of research papers and patents were generated in the United States, France, and Japan. In addition to the work being done in these countries and Spain, laser peening programs were initiated in China, Britain, Germany, and several other countries. The continuing growth of the technology and its applications led to the appearance of several commercial laser shock peening providers in the early 2000s.

GE Aviation and LSP Technologies were the first companies performing laser peening commercially, having licensed the technology from Battelle. GE Aviation performed laser peening for its aerospace engine components, and LSP Technologies marketed laser shock peening services and equipment to a broader industrial base. In the late 1990s, Metal Improvement Company (now part of Curtis Wright Surface Technologies) partnered with Lawrence Livermore National Laboratory to develop its own laser peening capabilities. In Japan, Toshiba Corporation expanded the commercial applications of its LPwC system to pressurized-water reactors, and in 2002 implemented fiber-optic beam delivery to the underwater laser-peening head. Toshiba also redesigned the laser and beam delivery into a compact system, enabling the entire system to be inserted into the pressure vessel. This system was ready for commercial use in 2013. MIC developed and adapted laser shock peening for forming the wing shapes on the Boeing 747-8.

The growth of industrial suppliers and commercial proof of laser-peening technology lead to many companies adopting laser-peening technology to solve and prevent problems. Some of the companies who have adopted laser peening include: GE, Rolls-Royce, Siemens, Boeing, Pratt & Whitney, and others.

In the 1990s and continuing through present day, laser-peening developments have targeted decreasing costs and increasing throughput to reach markets outside of high-cost low-volume components. High costs in the laser peening process were previously attributable to laser-system complexity, processing rates, manual labor, and overlay applications. Numerous ongoing advancements addressing these challenges have reduced laser-peening costs dramatically: laser-peening systems are designed to handle robust operations, pulse rates of laser systems are increasing, routine labor operations are increasingly automated, and application of overlays is automated in many cases. These reduced operational costs of laser peening have made it a valuable tool for solving an extended range of fatigue and related applications.

== Process description ==
Laser peening uses the dynamic mechanical effects of a shock wave imparted by a laser to modify the surface of a target material. It does not use thermal effects. Fundamentally, laser peening can be accomplished with only two components: a transparent overlay and a high-energy pulsed laser system. The transparent overlay confines the plasma formed at the target surface by the laser beam. It is also often beneficial to use a thin overlay, opaque to the laser beam, between the water overlay and the target surface. This opaque overlay can provide either or each of three benefits: protect the target surface from potentially detrimental thermal effects from the laser beam, provide a consistent surface for the beam–material interaction, and, if the overlay impedance is less than that of the target surface, increase the magnitude of the shock wave entering the target. However, there are situations where an opaque overlay is not used; in the Toshiba process, LPwC, or where the tradeoff between decreased cost and possibly somewhat-lowered surface residual stress allows superficial grinding or honing after laser peening to remove the thin thermally effected layer.

The laser-peening process originated with high-energy Nd-glass lasers producing pulse energies up to 50 J (more commonly 5–40 J) with pulse durations of 8 to 25 ns. Laser spot diameters on target are typically in the range of 2 to 7 mm. The processing sequence begins by applying the opaque overlay on the workpiece or target surface. Commonly used opaque overlay materials are black or aluminum tape, paint, or RapidCoater, a proprietary liquid. The tape or paint is generally applied over the entire area to be processed, while the RapidCoater is applied over each laser spot just before triggering the laser pulse. After application of the opaque overlay, the transparent overlay is placed over it. The transparent overlay used in production processing is water; it is cheap, easily applied, and easily removed, and it readily conforms to most complex surface geometries. It is applied to the surface just before triggering the laser pulse. Quartz or glass overlays produce much higher pressures than water, but are limited to flat surfaces, must be replaced after each shot, and would be difficult to handle in a production setting. Clear tape may be used, but requires labor to apply and is difficult to conform to complex surface features.

The transparent overlay allows the laser beam to pass through it without appreciable absorption of the laser energy or dielectric breakdown. When the laser is triggered, the beam passes through the transparent overlay and strikes the opaque overlay, immediately vaporizing a thin layer of the overlay material. This vapor is trapped in the interface between the transparent and opaque overlays. The continued delivery of energy during the laser pulse rapidly heats and ionizes the vapor, converting it into a rapidly expanding plasma. The rising pressure exerted on the opaque overlay surface by the expanding plasma enters the target surface as a high-amplitude stress wave or shock wave. Without a transparent overlay, the unconfined plasma plume moves away from the surface and the peak pressure is considerably lower.

If the amplitude of the shock wave is above the Hugoniot Elastic Limit (HEL), i.e., the dynamic yield strength, of the target, then the material plastically deforms during passage of the shock wave. The magnitude of the plastic strain decreases with distance from the surface as the peak pressure of the shock wave attenuates, and becomes zero when the peak pressure falls below the HEL. After the shock wave passes, the residual plastic strain creates a compressive residual stress gradient below the target surface, highest at or immediately below the surface and decreasing with depth. By varying the laser power density, pulse duration, and number of successive shots on an area, a range of surface compressive stress magnitudes and depths can be achieved. The magnitude of surface stresses are comparable to shot peening, but the depths are much greater, ranging up to 5 mm when using multiple shots on a spot. Generally spot densities of about 10–40 spots/cm^{2} are applied. The compressive stress depth achieved with the most common processing parameters ranges from 1 to 2 mm (0.039 to 0.079 in) deep. The deep compressive stresses are due to the shock wave's peak pressure being maintained above the HEL to greater depths than for other peening technologies.

There may be instances where it is cost-effective not to apply the opaque overlay and laser peen the bare surface of the work piece directly. When laser peening a bare metallic surface, a thin (micrometer-range) layer of surface material is vaporized. The rapid rise in temperature causes surface melting to a depth dependent on pulse energy and duration, and target melting point. On aluminum alloys this depth is nominally 10–20 μm, but on steels and other higher-melting-point alloys, the depths may be just a few micrometers. Due to the short duration of the pulse, the in-depth heating of the surface is limited to a few tens of micrometers due to the rapid quenching effect of the cold substrate. Some superficial surface staining of the work piece may occur, typically from oxidation products. These detrimental effects of bare surface processing, both aesthetic and metallurgical, can be removed after laser peening by light grinding or honing. With an opaque overlay in place, the target surface experiences temperature rises of less than 50–100 °C (90–180 °F) on a nanosecond time scale.

Laser pulses are generally applied sequentially on the target to treat areas larger than the laser spot size. Laser pulse shapes are customizable to circular, elliptical, square, and other profiles to provide the most convenient and efficient processing conditions. The spot size applied depends on a number of factors that include material HEL, laser-system characteristics, and other processing factors. The area to be laser peened is usually determined by the part geometry, the extent of the fatigue-critical area, and considerations of moving the compensating tensile stresses out of this area.

The more recently developed laser-peening process, the Toshiba LPwC process, varies in significant ways from the process described above. The LPwC process uses low-energy, high-frequency Nd-YAG lasers producing pulse energies of ≤ 0.1 J and pulse durations of ≤ 10 ns, using spot sizes ≤ 1 mm diameter. Because the process was originally intended to operate in large water-filled vessels, the wave frequency was doubled to halve the wavelength to 532 nm. The shorter wavelength decreases the absorption of beam energy while traveling through water to the target. Due to access constraints, no opaque overlay is applied to the target surface. This factor, combined with the small spot size, requires many shots to achieve a significant surface compressive stress and depths of 1 mm. The first layers applied produce a tensile surface stress due to surface melting, although a compressive stress is developed below the melt layer. However, as more layers are added, the increasing subsurface compressive stress "bleeds" back through the melted surface layer to produce the desired surface compressive stress. Depending on material properties and the desired compressive stresses, generally about 18–70 spots/mm^{2} or greater spot densities are applied, about 100 times the spot densities of the high-pulse-energy process. The effects of the higher spot densities on processing times are compensated for in part by the higher pulse frequency, 60 Hz, of the low-energy lasers. Newer generations of these laser systems are projected to operate at higher frequencies. This low-energy process achieves compressive residual stress magnitudes and depths equivalent to the high-energy process with nominal depths of 1 to 1.5 mm (0.039 to 0.059 in). However, the smaller spot size will not permit depths deeper than this.

== Quality systems for laser peening ==
The laser-peening process using computer control is described in AMS 2546. Like many other surface-enhancement technologies, direct measuring of the results of the process on the workpiece during processing is not practical. Therefore, process parameters (pulse energy, pulse duration, and overlays) are closely monitored during processing. Other quality-control systems are also available that rely on pressure measurements such as electromagnetic acoustic transducers (EMAT), Velocity Interferometer System for Any Reflector (VISAR) and PVDF gauges, and plasma radiometers. Almen strips are also used, but they function as a comparison tool and do not provide a definitive measure of laser peening intensity. The resultant residual stresses imparted by laser peening are routinely measured by industry using x-ray diffraction techniques for the purposes of process optimization and quality assurance.

== Laser peening systems ==
The initial laser systems used during the development of laser peening were large research lasers providing high-energy pulses at very low pulse frequencies. Since the mid-late 1990s, lasers designed specifically for laser peening featured steadily smaller sizes and higher pulse frequencies, both of these more desirable for production environments. Laser peening systems include both rod laser systems and a slab laser system. The rod laser systems can be separated roughly into three primary groups, recognizing that there is some overlap between them:

1. High-energy, low-repetition-rate lasers operating typically at 10–40 J per pulse with 8–25 ns pulse length at nominally 0.5–1 Hz rep rate, nominal spot sizes of 2 to 8 mm;
2. Intermediate-energy, intermediate-repetition-rate lasers operating at 3–10 J with 10–20 ns pulse width at 10 Hz rep rate, nominal spot sizes of 1–4 mm; and
3. Low-energy, high-repetition-rate lasers operating at ≤ 1 J per pulse with ≤ 10 ns pulse length at 60+ Hz rep rate, ≤ 1 mm spot size.

The slab laser system operates in the range of 10–25 J per pulse with 8–25 ns pulse duration at 3–5 Hz rep rate, nominal spot sizes of 2–5 mm. The commercial systems include rod lasers represented by all three groups and the slab laser system.

For each laser-peening system, the output beam from the laser is directed into a laser-peening cell containing the work pieces or parts to be processed. The peening cell contains the parts-handling system and provides the safe environment necessary for efficient commercial laser peening. The parts to be processed are usually introduced into the cell in batches. The parts are then picked and placed in the beam path by robots or other customized parts-handling systems. Within the work cell, the beam is directed to the surface of the work piece by an optical chain of mirrors or lenses. If tape is used, it is applied before the part enters the work cell, whereas water or RapidCoater overlays are applied within the cell individually for each spot. The workpiece, or sometimes the laser beam, is repositioned for each shot as necessary by a robot or other parts handling system. When the selected areas on each part have been processed, the batch is replaced in the work cell by another.

== Process effect ==
The shockwave-generated coldwork (plastic strain) in the workpiece material creates compressive and tensile residual stresses to maintain an equilibrium state of the material. These residual stresses are compressive at the workpiece surface and gradually fade into low tensile stresses below and surrounding the laser-peened area. The cold work also work-hardens the surface layer. The compressive residual stresses, and to a lesser extent, the coldwork, from laser peening have been shown to prevent and mitigate high cycle fatigue (HCF), low cycle fatigue (LCF), stress corrosion cracking, fretting fatigue, and, to some degree, wear and corrosion pitting. It is outstanding at mitigating foreign object damage in turbine blades.

The plastic strain introduced by laser peening is much lower than that introduced by other impact-peening technologies. As a result, the residual plastic strain has much greater thermal stability than the more heavily cold-worked microstructures. This enables the laser-peened compressive stresses to be retained at higher operating temperatures during long exposures than is the case for the other technologies. Among the applications benefiting from this are gas-turbine fan and compressor blades and nuclear plant components.

By enhancing material performance, laser peening enables more-efficient designs that reduce weight, extend component lifetimes, and increase performance. In the future, it is anticipated that laser peening will be incorporated into the design of fatigue-critical components to achieve longer life, lighter weight, and perhaps a simpler design to manufacture.

== Other applications of laser-peening technologies ==
Originally, the use of laser-induced shock waves on metals to achieve property or functional benefits was referred to as laser shock processing, a broader, more inclusive term. As it happened, laser peening was the first commercial aspect of laser shock processing. However, laser-induced shock waves have found uses in other industrial applications outside of surface-enhancement technologies.

One application is for metal shaping or forming. By selectively laser shocking areas on the surface of metal sheets or plates, or smaller items such as airfoils, the associated compressive residual stresses cause the material to flex in a controllable manner. In this way, a particular shape can be imparted to a component, or a distorted component might be brought back into the desired shape. Thus, this process is capable of bringing manufactured parts back into design tolerance limits and form-shaping thin section parts.

Another variation is to use the shock wave for spallation testing of materials. This application is based on the behavior of shockwaves to reflect from the rear free surface of a work piece as a tensile wave. Depending on material properties and shock wave characteristics, the reflected tensile wave may be strong enough to form microcracks or voids near the back surface, or actually "blow-off" or spall material from the back surface. This approach has some value for testing ballistic materials.

Use of laser shocks to measure the bond strength of coatings on metals has been developed over a period of years in France called LASAT for Laser Adhesion Test. This application is also based on the behavior of shockwaves to reflect from the rear free surface of a work piece as a tensile wave. If the back surface is coated with an adherent coating, then the tensile wave can be tailored to fracture the bond upon reflection from the surface. By controlling the characteristics of the shock wave, the bond strength of the coating can be measured, or alternatively, determined in a comparative sense.

Careful tailoring of the shockwave shape and intensity has also enabled the inspection of bonded composite structures via laser shocking. The technology, termed laser bond inspection, initiates a shockwave that reflects off the backside of a bonded structure and returns as a tensile wave. As the tensile wave passes back through the adhesive bond, depending on the strength of the bond and the peak tensile stress of the stress wave, the tensile wave will either pass through the bond or rupture it. By controlling the pressure of the tensile wave, this procedure is capable of reliably locally testing adhesion strength between bonded joints. This technology is most often found in application to bonded fiber composite material structures but has also been shown to be successful in evaluating bonds between metals and composite materials. Fundamental issues are also studied to characterize and quantify the effects of shock waves produced by lasers inside these complex materials.

== See also ==
- Autofrettage
- Corrosion fatigue
- Damage tolerance
- Fatigue (material)
- Foreign object damage
- Fretting
- High-frequency impact treatment – aftertreatment of weld transitions
- Low plasticity burnishing
- Peening
- Plastic deformation
- Residual stress
- Shot peening
- Stress corrosion cracking
- Ultrasonic impact treatment
