= Peen =

Peen may refer to:

- Part of the head of a hammer, as in a ball-peen hammer (also ball-pein, or ball and pein)
- Peening, the changing of a metal's properties by impacting its surface
  - Shot peening, bombarding metal parts with small spherical media
    - Shot peening of steel belts, a remedial solution for deformed steel belts
  - Laser peening, focusing lasers on the surface of a metal part
  - Peening (scythe blade), peening a scythe or sickle blade as a step in the sharpening process
- A slang term for penis

== See also ==
- Peene (disambiguation)
- Pein
- Peen tong, a Chinese brown sugar and sugar candy
