= Pean =

Pean or PEAN may refer to:

- Pean (bishop of Poznan), a 12th-century bishop of Poznan
- Pean (heraldry), a variant of the ermine fur motif
- péan, a hemostat, named after Jules-Émile Péan
- PEAN/ΠΕΑΝ, the Panhellenic Union of Fighting Youths, a Greek Resistance organization under the Axis Occupation of Greece
- PEAN, the student yearbook of the Phillips Exeter Academy

== See also ==
- paean, a song or poem of praise or triumph
- peen (disambiguation)
