= Steel abrasive =

Steel particles used as abrasive material

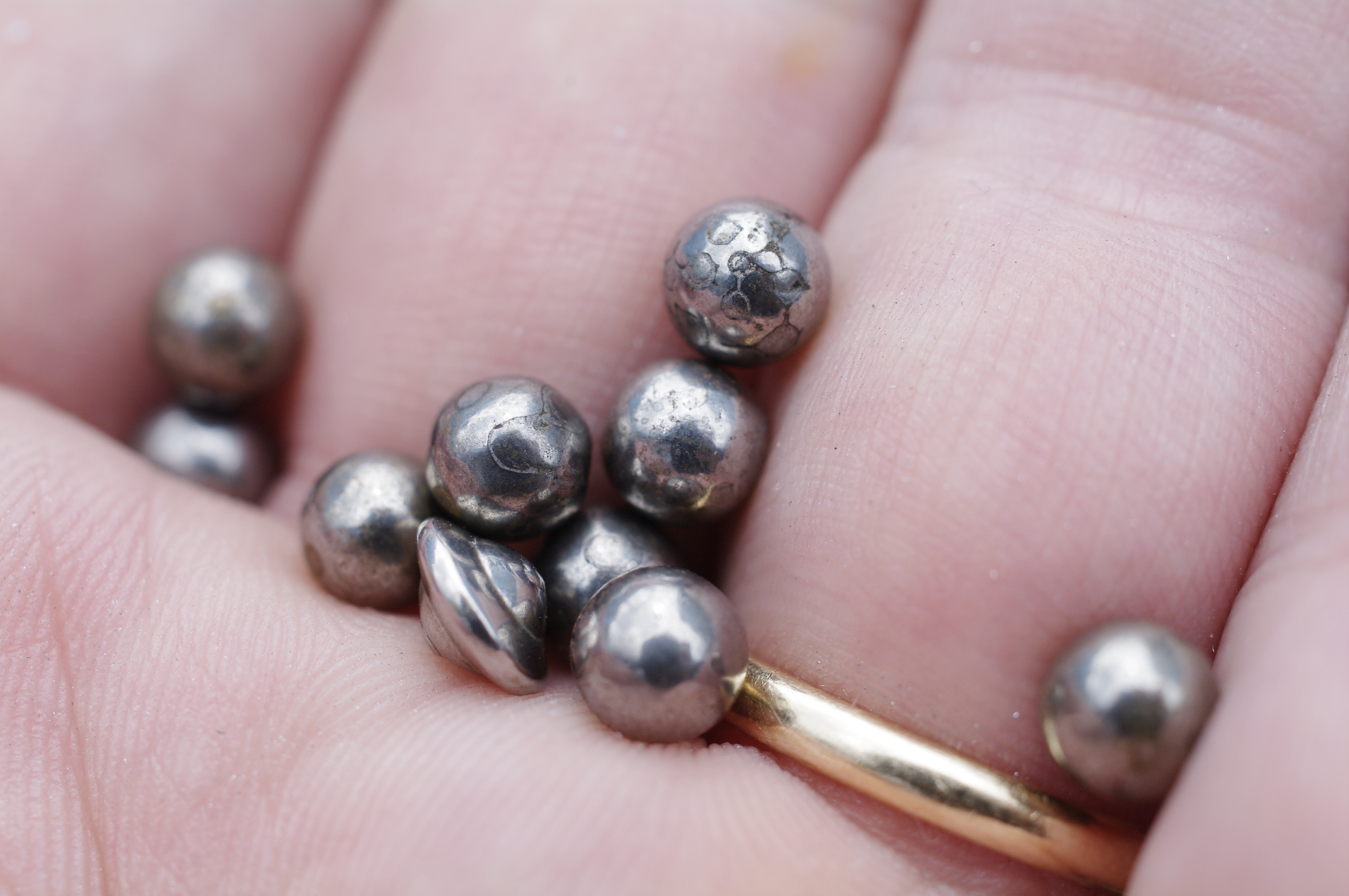
Steel abrasive media

Steel abrasives are steel particles that are used as abrasive or peening media. They are usually available in two different shapes (shot and grit) that address different industrial applications.

Steel shot refers to spherical grains made of molten steel through an atomization ("granulation") process, available in different sizes and hardnesses.

Steel grit characterizes grains with a predominantly angular shape. These grains are obtained by crushing steel shot, therefore they exhibit sharp edges and broken sections. Harder than steel shot, it is also available in different sizes and hardnesses.

== Properties ==
Most steel abrasives are made of a high-carbon steel composition, the best compromise between mechanical properties, efficiency and durability. The most important properties for steel abrasives are hardness, grain size and shape, toughness and cleanliness (lack of oxides, contaminants, etc.).

=== Recyclability and environmental impact ===
The recyclability of steel shot and grit ranges between 2000 and 3000 cycles. Due to its high recyclability level, steel shot and grit tend to generate less waste when compared to other expendable abrasives.

=== Hardness ===
Steel shot or grit is usually available at different hardness levels, ranging between 40 and 65 on the Rockwell scale (400 to 850 on the Vickers hardness scale).

== Industrial applications ==
=== Cleaning ===
Steel shot and grit are used in cleaning applications for removal of loose material on metal surfaces. This type of cleaning is common in automotive industry (motor blocks, cylinder heads, etc.).

=== Surface preparation ===
Surface preparation is a series of operations including cleaning and physical modification of a surface. Steel shot and grit are used in a surface preparation process for cleaning metal surfaces which are covered with mill scale, dirt, rust, or paint coatings and for physically modifying the metal surface such as creating roughness for better application of paint and coating. The steel shots are generally employed in shot blasting machines, first made by US-based company Wheelabrator in 1932. In China, shot blasting machines were built around the 1950s, Qinggong Machinery is one of the earliest manufacturers in that industry.

=== Stone cutting ===
Steel grit is used in cutting hard stones, such as granite. The grit is used in large multi-blade frames which cut the blocks of granite into thin slices.

=== Shot peening ===
Shot peening is the repeated striking of a metal surface by hard shot particles. These multiple impacts produce a deformation on the metal surface, but also improve the durability of the metal part. The media used in this application is spherical rather than angular. The reason is that spherical shots are more resistant to the fracture which happens due to the striking impact.and distributes the peening force more evenly and reduces the risk of stress risers. This makes steel shots a better choice for shot peening in aircraft engineering, where the peened surface must be strong and fatigue-resistant.

=== Debarring & Descaling ===
Dustless Steel shot is being used in combination with Steel shots in range of 0.18 mm - 2.80 mm in size for descaling and debarring the surface before further process

== Industrial uses ==
Steel shot and grit address numerous sectors since cleaning, surface preparation or shot peening applications are used by many industries as a part of their construction, renovation or repair processes. The main industrial sectors employing steel abrasives are:

- Automotive industry
- Construction
- Metallurgy
- Petrochemical industry
- Ball milling

== Production ==
The annual steel abrasive production in the world is estimated to be above 1 million tonnes, the world’s largest producer being Winoa Group (previously known as Wheelabrator Allevard) by production and capacity.

== See also ==
- Abrasive blasting
- Abrasive machining
