= Shot peen forming =

Application of shot peening technique

Shot peen forming is a specialized application of shot peening for forming metal sheets into complex shapes. The compressive stresses induced by the impact of the shot can be used to change the shape of the component into a desired contour. Shot peen forming is a dieless process generally performed at room temperature. It was first used for forming the wing skins of airplanes at Lockheed Aircraft Corporation during the 1940s and was patented by that company as a "Method of cold forming sheets" in 1951. Today it is widely used in the aerospace industry for shaping wing skins and can also be used for forming aircraft fuselage skins and rocket tank panels.
