= Mic (name) =

Mic or Mik is a given name, nickname, and surname. It may refer to:

== People with the given name ==
- Mic Conway (born 1951), Australian vocalist
- Mic Gillette (1951–2016), American brass player
- Mic Jordan, American rapper and activist
- Mic Looby (born 1969), Australian author and illustrator
- Mic Sokoli (1839–1881), Albanian nationalist figure and guerrilla fighter

== People with the nickname ==
- Mic Christopher (1969–2001), American-Irish singer-songwriter
- Mic Geronimo (born 1973), American hip-hop rapper
- Mic Michaeli (born 1962), Swedish keyboardist
- Mic Murphy (born 1958), American musician

== People with the surname ==
- Ouk Mic (born 1980), Cambodian footballer

== See also ==
- Mic (disambiguation)
- Mick
- Michael
