= LSP Technologies =

American laser peening company

LSP Technologies, Inc.
- Company type: Private
- Industry: Laser peening
- Founded: 1995
- Defunct: 2023
- Headquarters: Dublin, Ohio, United States
- Area served: Worldwide
- Key people: Jeff Dulaney, Founder
- Products: Laser technologies
- Website: www.lsptechnologies.com

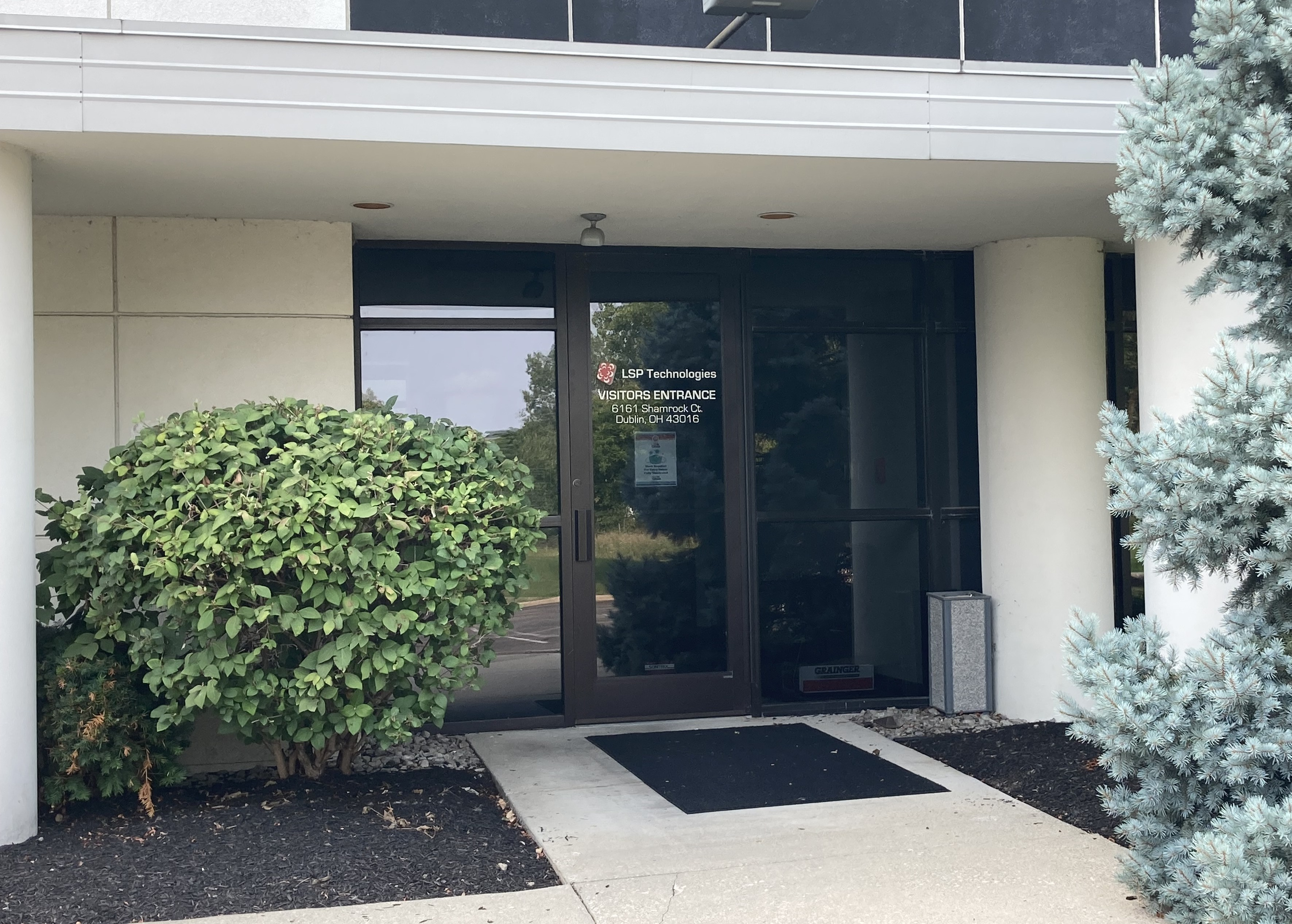
Visitor entrance

LSP Technologies, Inc. (also known as LSPT) was located in Dublin, Ohio. The company provided laser peening surface enhancement services and equipment, and other laser technologies.

== History ==
The company founder, Jeff Dulaney, earned his Ph.D. in Physics at the University of Pittsburgh in 1986, then worked at Battelle Columbus Laboratory from 1987 to 1994 as a physicist in the laser department. He helped design and build the first industrial laser shock peening system for Wagner Laser Technologies in the early 1990s. Dr. Dulaney acquired Battelle’s laser shock peening patent rights and formed LSP Technologies, Inc. in February 1995. Dr. Allan Clauer, an original patent holder of the laser peening process, and a Battelle inventor of the laser shock peening process, joined LSPT as Vice-President later in 1995.

In 1996 to 1999, LSPT assembled and delivered three high power ND: Glass laser peening systems to General Electric Aviation in Cincinnati, Ohio. LSPT also won several Small Business Innovation Research (SBIR) awards for laser peening, laser bond inspection, and laser land mine neutralization. In March 2003 LSPT began production laser peen processing on 4th stage IBR in Pratt & Whitney’s F119 engine for the F-22 Raptor. In 2009 LSPT began laser peening production services for power generation and forging industries. In 2012, LSPT delivered a laser bond inspection system to the Boeing Company in Seattle, WA.

LSPT was a AS9100 certified company for Laser Processing Services and Equipment Design.

As of May 30, 2023 LSP Technologies was placed in receivership by order of the Court of Common Pleas, Summit County Ohio, Case # CV-2023-05-1664. At 10:00 PM on August 27, 2023, by order of the court-appointed receiver, LSP Technologies ceased all operations.

== Processes ==
- Laser peening
- Laser bond inspection

== Inventions ==
LSPT held over 54 patents in laser peening, and many more on laser bond inspection and laser applications.
