= Pein =

Pein is a surname. Notable people with the surname include:

- Friedrich Pein (1915–1975), Austrian sniper
- Karen Pein (born 1973), German politician
- Malcolm Pein (born 1960), British chess player, author, and journalist

== See also ==
- Peins, a village in the Netherlands
- Peen (disambiguation)
