= MICS =

MICS or mics may refer to:

- Master of Information and Cybersecurity
- Medical Implant Communication Service, a specification for a frequency band used by medical implants
- Microphones
- Minimal inhibitory concentrations, in microbiology, the lowest concentrations of antimicrobials that will inhibit growth of a microorganism
- Minimally invasive cardiac surgery, refers to alternative approaches to heart surgery, making use of several small incisions instead of the traditional open-chest procedure
- Multiple Indicator Cluster Survey, a household survey program developed by UNICEF
- Member of the Irish Computer Society
- Member of the Institute of Chartered Shipbrokers
- Modular Integrated Communications System (MICS), a phone system by Norstar
- Nasdaq ticker symbol for The Singing Machine Company

== See also ==
- MIC (disambiguation)
