= Peene (disambiguation) =

Peene may refer to:

- Peene, a river in Germany
- Peene Becque, a river in France
- Peene, Kent, a village in England
- Hippoliet van Peene (1811–1864), a Flemish physician and playwright

== See also ==
- Peen (disambiguation)
