= Metal-induced crystallization =

Combined with certain metallic species, amorphous films can crystallize in a process known as metal-induced crystallization (MIC). The effect was discovered in 1969, when amorphous germanium (a-Ge) films crystallized at surprisingly low temperatures when in contact with aluminum, silver, copper, or tin. The effect was also verified in amorphous silicon (a-Si) films, as well as in amorphous carbon and various metal-oxide films.

Likewise, the MIC evolved from simple temperature-driven annealing approaches to others involving lasers or microwave radiation, for example.

A very common variant of the MIC procedure is the metal-induced lateral crystallization (MILC). In this case, the metal is deposited (onto the top or at the bottom) of some selected areas of the desired amorphous film. Upon annealing, crystallization starts from the portion of the amorphous film that is in contact with the metal species, and the MIC proceeds laterally.
