= Ultrasonic impact treatment =

Metallurgical surface treatment

Ultrasonic impact treatment (UIT) is a metallurgical processing technique, similar to work hardening, in which ultrasonic energy is applied to a metal object. This technique is part of the high-frequency mechanical impact (HFMI) class of processes. Other terms include ultrasonic needle peening (UNP) and ultrasonic peening (UP). Ultrasonic impact treatment can result in controlled residual compressive stress, grain refinement, and grain size reduction. Low- and high-cycle fatigue are enhanced and have been documented to provide increases up to ten times greater than non-UIT specimens.

== Theory ==
In UIT, ultrasonic waves are produced by an electro-mechanical ultrasonic transducer, and applied to a workpiece. An acoustically-tuned resonator bar is caused to vibrate by energizing it with a magnetostrictive or Piezoelectric ultrasonic transducer. The energy generated from these high-frequency impulses is imparted to the treated surface through the contact of specially designed steel pins. These transfer pins are free to move axially between the resonant body and the treated surface.

When the tool, made up of the ultrasonic transducer, pins, and other components, comes into contact with the work piece, it acoustically couples with the work piece, creating harmonic resonance. This harmonic resonance is performed at a carefully calibrated frequency, to which metals respond very favorably, resulting in compressive residual stress, stress relief, and grain-structure improvements.

Depending on the desired effects of treatment, a combination of different frequencies and displacement amplitude is applied. Depending on the tool and the original equipment manufacturer, these frequencies range between 15 and 55 kHz, with the displacement amplitude of the resonant body between 20 and 80 μm (0.00079 and 0.00315 in).

== Application ==
UIT is highly controllable. Incorporating a programmable logic controller (PLC) or a digital ultrasonic generator, the frequency and amplitude of UIT are easily set and maintained, thus removing a significant portion of operator dependency. UIT can also be mechanically controlled, thus providing repeatability of results from one application to the next. Examples of mechanical control employed with UIT include CNC milling machines, lathes, robotic control, and weld tractors. With these types of controlled applications, the surface finish of the work piece is highly controllable.

For many applications, UIT is most effectively employed by hand. The high portability of the UIT system enables travel to austere locations and hard-to-reach places. The flexibility that is facilitated by variations in the tool configuration (such as angle-peening-head) ensures that access to very tight locations is possible.

UIT's effectiveness has been illustrated on the following metals, among others:

- Aluminium (including sensitized Aluminium)
- Bronze
- Cobalt alloys
- Nickel alloys
- Steels
  - Carbon steel
  - Stainless steel
  - High-strength low-alloy steel
  - Manganese steel
- Titanium

== History ==
UIT was originally developed in 1972 and has since been perfected by a team of Russian scientists under the leadership of Dr. Efim Statnikov. Originally developed and used to enhance the fatigue and corrosion attributes of ship and submarine structures, UIT has been used in aerospace, mining, offshore drilling, shipbuilding, infrastructure, automotive, energy production, and other industries. Different industrial solutions exist nowadays and are commercialized by a limited number of original equipment manufacturers worldwide.

== Practical applications ==
UIT enables life extension of steel bridges. This technique has been employed in numerous US states as well as other nations. The result is a greatly reduced cost of infrastructure. UIT has been certified for this use by AASHTO.

The use of UIT on draglines and other heavy equipment in the mining industry has resulted in increased production and has decreased downtime and maintenance costs.

UIT is employed on drive shafts and crank shafts in a number of industries. Results show that UIT increases shaft life by over a factor of 3.

The US Navy uses UIT to address cracked areas in certain aluminum decks. Without UIT, crack repairs resulted in almost immediate re-cracking. With UIT, repairs have shown to last over eight months without cracks.

== See also ==
- High frequency impact treatment
- Corrosion fatigue
- Stress corrosion cracking
- Welding
