= Microphone (disambiguation) =

A microphone is an acoustic-to-electric transducer or sensor that converts sound into an electrical signal.

Microphone may also refer to:

- "Microphone" (Darin song)
- Microphone (film), a 2010 Egyptian independent film
- "Microphone", song by Slaughterhouse from Slaughterhouse
- "Microphone" a song by 98 Degrees from their 2013 studio album 2.0
- The Microphones, an American musical project
- Microphone Records, a Latvian record label and distribution company
