= Solid film lubricant =

Coating

Solid film lubricants are paint-like coatings of very fine particles of lubricating pigment blended with a binder and other additives. The lubricant is applied to a substrate by spray, dip or brush methods and, once cured, creates a solid film which repels water, reduces friction and increases the wear life of the substrate to which it has been applied. Certain film lubricants also offer additional properties such as corrosion inhibition. Solid film lubricants are used in the automotive, transportation and aerospace industries. 2 commonly used ones are graphite and molybdenum disulfide.
