= Major immunogene complex =

The Major immunogene complex (MIC) is a gene sequence containing loci coding for antigens on lymphocyte surface (Ia) histocompatibility (H) antigens, products of immune responses, and components system proteins.

The genes that code for immunoglobulins are assorted independently of the MIC, but the plasma cells which produce immunoglobulins are under the control of products of the MIC.

== See also ==
- Major histocompatibility complex
- Immune system
