= Foreign object damage =

Damage to aircraft by objects

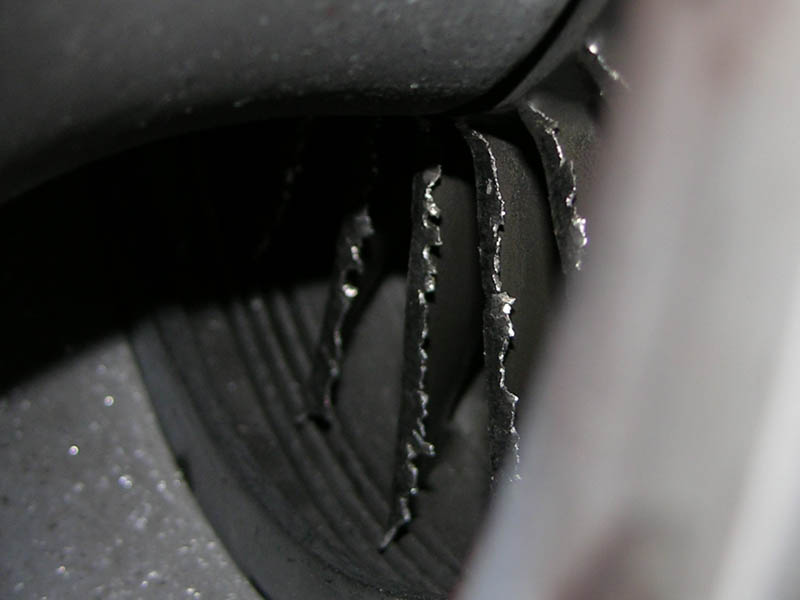
Foreign object damage to the compressor blades of a Honeywell LTS101 turboshaft engine on a Bell 222, caused by a small bolt that passed through the protective inlet screen

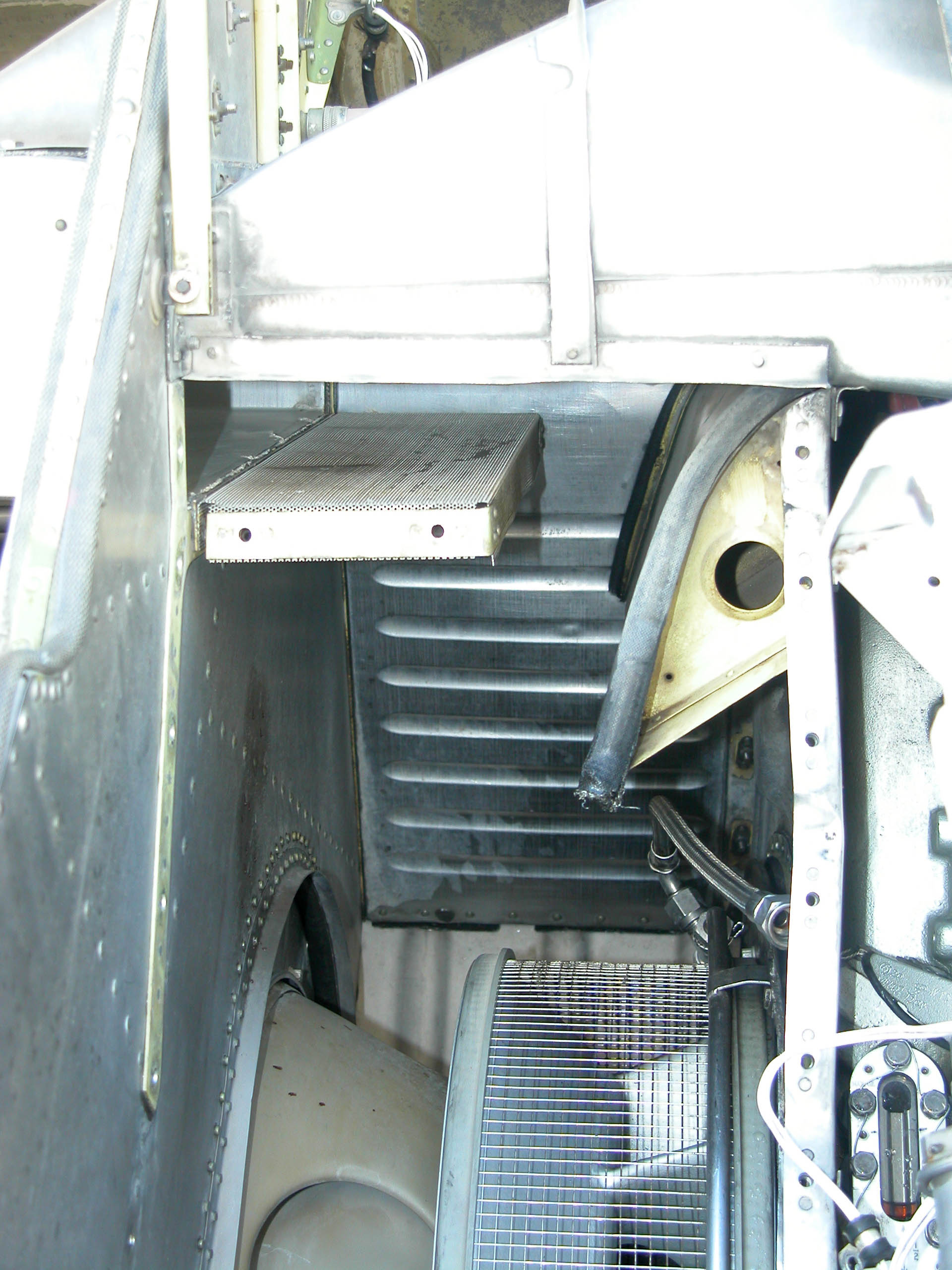
FOD deflection system on a PT6T installed on a Bell 412. Air enters from upper right, and pure air follows the curved ramp down to the compressor inlet (also covered by a screen). Any debris being sucked in will have enough momentum that it will not make such a sharp bend, and will hit the screen on the upper left, and will be carried out to the left, getting blown overboard.

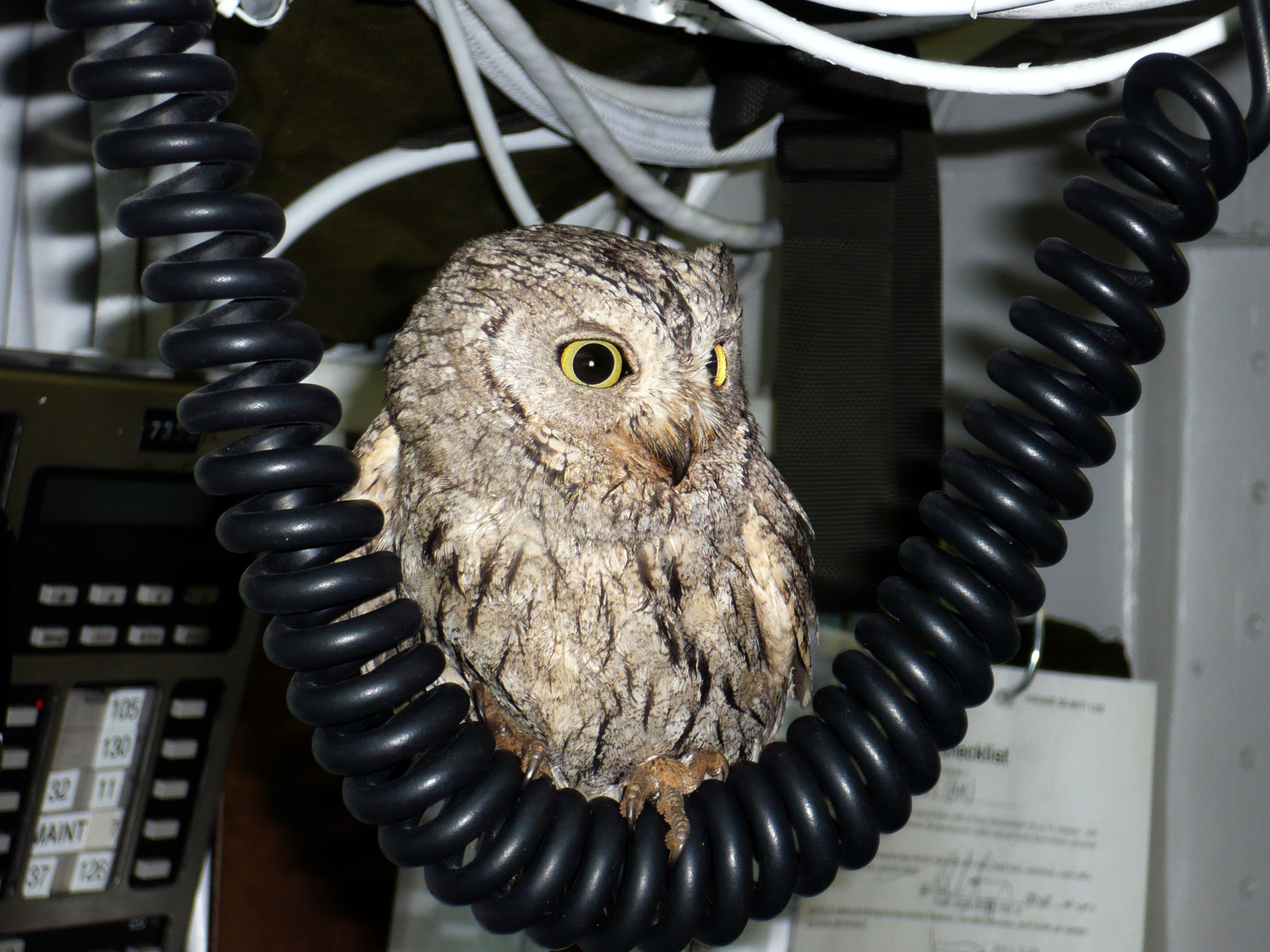
Potential foreign object debris (in this case, a Scops owl) found in the wheel well of an F/A-18 Hornet on a US aircraft carrier

In aviation and aerospace, the term foreign object damage (FOD) refers to any damage to an aircraft attributed to foreign object debris (also referred to as "FOd", note the lowercase letter), which is any particle or substance, alien to an aircraft or system which could potentially cause damage to it.

External FOD hazards include bird strikes, hail, ice, sandstorms, ash-clouds or objects left on a runway or flight deck. Internal FOD hazards include items left in the cockpit that interfere with flight safety by getting tangled in control cables, jam moving parts or short-out electrical connections.

== Jet engine damage ==
Jet engines can suffer major damage from even small objects being sucked into the engine. In the United States, the Federal Aviation Administration (FAA) requires that all engine types pass a test which includes firing a fresh chicken (dead, but not frozen) into a running jet engine from a small cannon. The engine does not have to remain functional after the test, but it must not cause significant damage to the rest of the aircraft. Thus, if the bird strike causes it to "throw a blade" (break apart in a way where parts fly off at high speed), doing so must not cause loss of the aircraft.

== Engine and airframe designs which avoid FOD ==
Some military aircraft had a unique design to prevent FOD from damaging the engine. The design included an S-shaped bend in the airflow, so that air entered the inlet, was bent back towards the front of the plane, and bent back again towards the back before entering the engine. At the back of the first bend a strong spring held a door shut. Any foreign object flying in the intake flew in, hit the door, opened it, flew through, and then exited the aircraft. Thus, only small objects swept up by the air could enter the engine. This design did indeed prevent FOD problems, but the constriction and drag induced by the bending of the airflow reduced the engine's effective power, and thus the design was not repeated.

A similar approach is used on many turboshaft-powered helicopters, such as the Mi-24, which use a "vortex-type" or "centrifugal" intake, in which the air is forced to flow through a spiral path before entering the engine; the heavier dust and other debris are forced outwards, where it is separated from the airflow before it enters the engine inlet.

The Russian Mikoyan MiG-29 and Sukhoi Su-27 fighters have a special intake design to prevent ingestion of FOD during take-off from rough airfields. The main air intakes could be closed with mesh doors and special inlets on the top of the intakes temporarily opened. This would allow enough airflow to the engine for take-off but reduced the chances of the engine sucking up objects from the ground.

Another interesting design to minimize the risk of FOD is that of the Antonov An-74, which has a very high placement of the engines.

Boeing offered a gravel runway kit for early 737s that allows the plane to be used from unimproved and gravel runways, in spite of having very low-slung engines. This kit included gravel deflectors on the landing gear; foldaway lights on the bottom of the plane; and screens that prevented gravel, which would enter the open wheelwells when the gear was extended, from hitting critical components. The kit also included vortex dissipators, devices which would reduce the airflow into the engine from the bottom so as to reduce the likelihood of ingesting gravel.

Airbus engineers are investigating a novel approach to reducing FOD. By developing, in conjunction with Israel Aerospace Industries, the Taxibot, a tractor controlled by the pilot, aircraft will not need to use jet engines while taxiing, and therefore they will not be vulnerable to FOD on aprons or taxiways.

== Examples ==
=== Vehicle tire track-in ===
Debris is often trapped in the treads of tires from vehicles coming onto an airfield. Types of debris trapped in a vehicle tire can include rocks, mud, stones, loose hardware (screws, washers, bolts, etc.) and many other forms of small materials. These can be crew and fuel trucks, maintenance vehicles and many others that inadvertently bring debris to a flight line and deposit it there. These types of FOD are very difficult to track and manage once they are introduced onto the airfield. A jet engine intake, engine blast, and propeller or helicopter rotor draft then can pick up the debris easily. This material, once loose around operational aircraft, can lead to serious safety concerns, including personnel injury and equipment and property damage.

=== Runway debris ===
The crash of a Concorde, Air France Flight 4590, at Charles de Gaulle Airport near Paris on 25 July 2000 was caused by FOD; in this case a piece of titanium debris on the runway which had been part of a thrust reverser that had fallen from a Continental Airlines McDonnell Douglas DC-10 during takeoff about four minutes earlier. The debris strike caused a tire to explode. Rubber debris from the tire struck the wing, rupturing a fuel tank and starting a severe fire leading to loss of control. All 100 passengers and nine crew on board the flight, as well as four people on the ground, were killed.

A Gates Learjet 36A, registration number N527PA, was taking off from Newport News/Williamsburg International Airport in Virginia on March 26, 2007, when the crew heard a loud "pop". Aborting the takeoff, the crew tried to control the "fishtailing" and activate the drogue parachute. The parachute did not work and the Learjet ran off the runway, its tires blown. Airport personnel reported seeing rocks and pieces of metal on the runway after the accident. The National Transportation Safety Board said that the accident was caused by FOD on the runway. Failure of the drogue parachute contributed to the accident.

=== Atmospheric debris ===
On 24 June 1982, British Airways Flight 9 en route to Perth, Australia, flew into a volcanic ash cloud over the Indian Ocean. The Boeing 747-200B suffered engine surges in all four engines until they all failed. The passengers and crew could see a phenomenon known as St. Elmo's fire around the plane. Flight 9 dived down until it exited the cloud allowing the airborne ash to clear the engines, which were then restarted. The cockpit windshield was badly pitted by the ash particles but the aircraft landed safely.

On 15 December 1989, KLM Flight 867, en route to Narita International Airport, Tokyo flew through a thick cloud of volcanic ash from Mount Redoubt, which had erupted the day before. The Boeing 747-400's four engines flamed out. After descending more than 14,000 feet, the crew restarted the engines and landed safely at Anchorage International Airport.

In 1991, an MD-81 operated by SAS, force landed in a forest after ice was reportedly ingested into both engines. All 129 people survived, but the aircraft was a total loss.

=== Item jettisoned from aircraft ===
An unusual case of FOD occurred on 28 September 1981 over Chesapeake Bay. During flight testing of an F/A-18 Hornet, the Naval Air Test Center of the United States Navy was using a Douglas TA-4J Skyhawk as a chase plane to film a jettison test of a bomb rack from the Hornet. The bomb rack struck the right wing of the Skyhawk, shearing off almost half the wing. The Skyhawk caught fire within seconds of being struck; the two people on board ejected.

=== Bird strikes ===
On 20 November 1975 a Hawker Siddeley HS.125 taking off at Dunsfold Aerodrome flew through a flock of northern lapwings immediately after lifting off the runway and lost power in both engines. The crew landed the aircraft back on the runway but it overran the end and crossed a road. The aircraft struck a car on the road, killing its six occupants. Although the aircraft was destroyed in the ensuing fire, the nine occupants of the aircraft survived the crash.

On 17 November 1980 a Hawker Siddeley Nimrod of the Royal Air Force crashed shortly after taking off from RAF Kinloss. It flew through a flock of Canada geese, causing three of its four engines to fail. The pilot and copilot were killed; the pilot was subsequently posthumously awarded an Air Force Cross for his actions in maintaining control of the aircraft and saving the lives of the 18 crew. The remains of 77 birds were found on or near the runway.

On January 15, 2009, US Airways Flight 1549 flew into a flock of Canada geese shortly after takeoff and suffered a double engine failure. The pilot ditched the aircraft in the Hudson River, saving the lives of all on board.

== Wildlife and wetlands near airports ==
Significant problems occur with airports where the grounds were or have become nesting areas for birds. While fences can prevent a moose or deer from wandering onto a runway, birds are more difficult to control. Often airports employ various methods of bird control to disperse or deter birds within their boundaries. Another solution under investigation is the use of artificial turf near runways, since it does not offer food, shelter, or water to wildlife.

=== Conferences ===
In the United States, the most prominent gathering of FOD experts has been the annual National Aerospace FOD Prevention Conference. It is hosted in a different city each year by National Aerospace FOD Prevention, Inc. (NAFPI), a nonprofit association that focuses on FOD education, awareness and prevention. Conference information, including presentations from past conferences, is available at the NAFPI Web site. However, NAFPI has come under some critique as being focused on tool control and manufacturing processes, and other members of the industry have stepped forward to fill the gaps. BAA hosted the world's first airport-led conference on the subject in November 2010.

== Detection technologies & FOD prevention ==
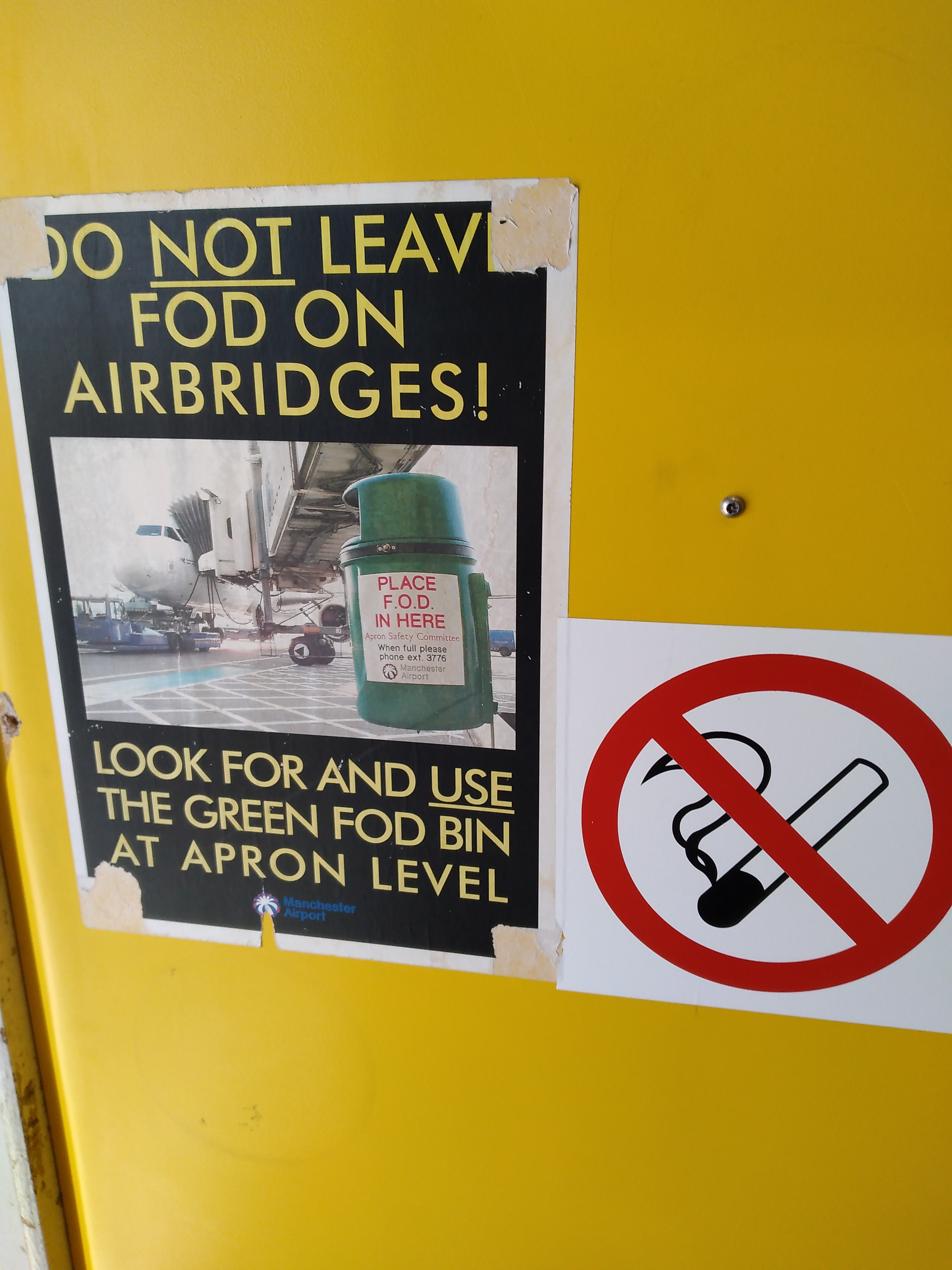
Do not leave FOD notice for passengers

There is some debate regarding FOD detection systems as the costs can be high and the domain of responsibility is not clear. However, one airport claims that their FOD detection system may have paid for itself in a single incident where personnel were alerted to a steel cable on the runway, before a single aircraft was put at risk. The FAA has investigated FOD detection technologies, and has set standards for the following categories:

- Radar
- Electro-optical (visible band imagery (standard CCTV) and low light cameras)
- Hybrid
- RFID on metal
- Manufactured FODS Mats - Track-Out Prevention & Track-In Control

== Damage tolerance improvements ==
The negative effects from FOD can be reduced or eliminated by introducing compressive residual stresses in critical fatigue areas into the part during the manufacturing process. These beneficial stresses are induced into the part through cold working the part with peening processes: shot peening, or laser peening. The deeper the compressive residual stress the more significant the fatigue life and damage tolerance improvement. Shot peening typically induces compressive stresses a few thousandths of an inch deep, laser peening typically imparts compressive residual stresses 0.040 to 0.100 inches deep. Laser peen induced compressive stresses are also more resistant to heat exposure.

== Technologies, information and training materials helpful in preventing FOD ==
- Aerospace tool control systems
- FOD prevention program manuals
- Magnetic bars
- Promotional and awareness materials
- Tool and parts control/retrieval
- Tow-behind friction sweeper
- Tow-behind sweepers
- Training materials
- Vacuum truck sweepers
- Walk-behind sweepers
- FOD prevention mats

== Economic impact ==
Internationally, FOD costs the aviation industry US$13 billion per year in direct plus indirect costs. The indirect costs are as much as ten times the direct cost value, representing delays, aircraft changes, incurred fuel costs, unscheduled maintenance, and the like. and causes expensive, significant damage to aircraft and parts and death and injury to workers, pilots and passengers.

It is estimated that FOD costs major airlines in the United States $26 per flight in aircraft repairs, plus $312 in such additional indirect costs as flight delays, plane changes and fuel inefficiencies.

"There are other costs that are not as easy to calculate but are equally disturbing," according to UK Royal Air Force Wing Commander and FOD researcher Richard Friend. "From accidents such as the Air France Concorde, Flight AF 4590, there is the loss of life, suffering and effect on the families of those who died, the suspicion of malpractice, guilt, and blame that could last for lifetimes. This harrowing torment is incalculable but should not be forgotten, ever. If everyone kept this in mind, we would remain vigilant and forever prevent foreign object debris from causing a problem. In fact, many factors combine to cause a chain of events that can lead to a failure."

== Studies ==
There have only been two detailed studies of the economic cost of FOD for civil airline operations. The first was by Brad Bachtel of Boeing, who published a value of $4 billion USD per year. This top-down value was for several years the standard industry figure for the cost of FOD. The second work (2007) was by Iain McCreary from the consultancy Insight SRI Ltd. This more detailed report offered a first-cut of the cost of FOD, based on a bottom-up analysis of airline maintenance log records. Here, data was broken into per flight direct costs and per flight indirect costs for the top 300 global airports, with detailed footnotes on the supporting data. The Insight SRI research was a standard reference for 2007–2009 as it was the only source presenting costs and thus was quoted by regulators, airports, and technology providers alike.

However, while that 2007 Insight SRI paper remains the best free public source of data, the new analysis (2010) from Insight SRI offers new numbers. The author of the new report (not free) says "Readers are cautioned not to rely on or in the future refer to numbers from the 2007-08 Insight SRI paper The Economic Cost of FOD to Airlines. This earlier effort was 'The' first document detailing the direct and indirect cost of FOD that was based on airline maintenance data (the entire document was a single page of data, followed by 8 pages of footnotes)."

Per-flight direct costs of $26 are calculated by considering engine maintenance spending, tire replacements, and aircraft body damage.

Per-flight indirect costs include a total of 33 individual categories:

1. Airport efficiency losses
2. Carbon / environmental issues
3. Change of aircraft
4. Close airport
5. Close runway
6. Corporate manslaughter/criminal liability
7. Cost of corrective action
8. Cost of hiring and training replacement
9. Cost of rental or lease of replacement equipment
10. Cost of restoration of order
11. Cost of the investigation
12. Delay for planes in air
13. Delays at gate
14. Fines and citations
15. Fuel efficiency losses
16. Hotels
17. In-air go-around
18. Increased insurance premiums
19. Increased operating costs on remaining equipment
20. Insurance deductibles
21. Legal fees resulting
22. Liability claims in excess of insurance
23. Loss of aircraft
24. Loss of business and damage to reputation
25. Loss of productivity of injured personnel
26. Loss of spares or specialized equipment
27. Lost time and overtime
28. Missed connections
29. Morale
30. Reaction by crews leading to disruption of schedule
31. Replacement flights on other carriers
32. Scheduled maintenance
33. Unscheduled maintenance

The study concludes that when these indirect costs are added, then the cost of FOD increases by a multiple of up to 10 times.

Eurocontrol and the FAA are both studying FOD. Eurocontrol released a preliminary assessment of FOD detection technologies in 2006, while the FAA is conducting trials of the four leading systems from Qinetiq (PVD, Providence T. F. Green Airport), Stratech (ORD, Chicago O'Hare International Airport), Xsight Systems (BOS, Boston Logan International Airport), and Trex Aviation Systems (ORD, Chicago O'Hare Airport) during 2007 and 2008. Results of this study should be published in 2009.

== See also ==
- Aviation safety
- Ground collision
- Runway incursion
