= Corrosion fatigue =

Fatigue in a corrosive environment

Corrosion fatigue is fatigue in a corrosive environment. It is the mechanical degradation of a material under the joint action of corrosion and cyclic loading. Nearly all engineering structures experience some form of alternating stress, and are exposed to harmful environments during their service life. The environment plays a significant role in the fatigue of high-strength structural materials like steel, aluminum alloys and titanium alloys. Materials with high specific strength are being developed to meet the requirements of advancing technology. However, their usefulness depends to a large extent on the degree to which they resist corrosion fatigue.

The effects of corrosive environments on the fatigue behavior of metals were studied as early as 1930.

The phenomenon should not be confused with stress corrosion cracking, where corrosion (such as pitting) leads to the development of brittle cracks, growth and failure. The only requirement for corrosion fatigue is that the sample be under tensile stress.

== Effect of corrosion on S-N diagram ==
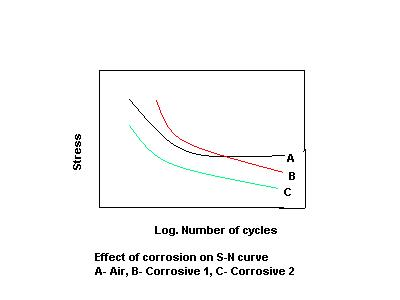
Effect of corrosion on S-N diagram

The effect of corrosion on a smooth-specimen S-N diagram is shown schematically on the right. Curve A shows the fatigue behavior of a material tested in air. A fatigue threshold (or limit) is seen in curve A, corresponding to the horizontal part of the curve. Curves B and C represent the fatigue behavior of the same material in two corrosive environments. In curve B, the fatigue failure at high stress levels is retarded, and the fatigue limit is eliminated. In curve C, the whole curve is shifted to the left; this indicates a general lowering in fatigue strength, accelerated initiation at higher stresses and elimination of the fatigue limit.

To meet the needs of advancing technology, higher-strength materials are developed through heat treatment or alloying. Such high-strength materials generally exhibit higher fatigue limits, and can be used at higher service stress levels even under fatigue loading. However, the presence of a corrosive environment during fatigue loading eliminates this stress advantage, since the fatigue limit becomes almost insensitive to the strength level for a particular group of alloys. This effect is schematically shown for several steels in the diagram on the left, which illustrates the debilitating effect of a corrosive environment on the functionality of high-strength materials under fatigue.

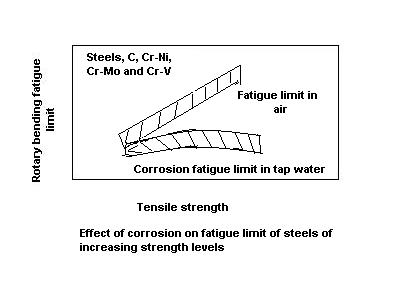
Effect of corrosion on fatigue limits of steels

Corrosion fatigue in aqueous media is an electrochemical behavior. Fractures are initiated either by pitting or persistent slip bands. Corrosion fatigue may be reduced by alloy additions, inhibition and cathodic protection, all of which reduce pitting. Since corrosion-fatigue cracks initiate at a metal's surface, surface treatments like plating, cladding, nitriding and shot peening were found to improve the materials resistance to this phenomenon.

== Crack-propagation studies in corrosion fatigue ==
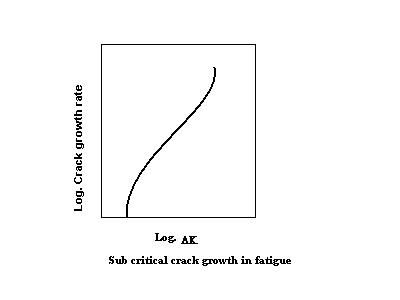
Schematic of typical fatigue-crack-growth behavior

In normal fatigue-testing of smooth specimens, about 90 percent is spent in crack nucleation and only the remaining 10 percent in crack propagation. However, in corrosion fatigue crack nucleation is facilitated by corrosion; typically, about 10 percent of life is sufficient for this stage. The rest (90 percent) of life is spent in crack propagation. Thus, it is more useful to evaluate crack-propagation behavior during corrosion fatigue.

Fracture mechanics uses pre-cracked specimens, effectively measuring crack-propagation behavior. For this reason, emphasis is given to crack-propagation velocity measurements (using fracture mechanics) to study corrosion fatigue. Since fatigue crack grows in a stable fashion below the critical stress-intensity factor for fracture (fracture toughness), the process is called sub-critical crack growth.

The diagram on the right shows typical fatigue-crack-growth behavior. In this log-log plot, the crack-propagation velocity is plotted against the applied stress-intensity range. Generally there is a threshold stress-intensity range, below which crack-propagation velocity is insignificant. Three stages may be visualized in this plot. Near the threshold, crack-propagation velocity increases with increasing stress-intensity range. In the second region, the curve is nearly linear and follows Paris' law(6); in the third region crack-propagation velocity increases rapidly, with the stress-intensity range leading to fracture at the fracture-toughness value.

Crack propagation under corrosion fatigue may be classified as a) true corrosion fatigue, b) stress corrosion fatigue or c) a combination of true, stress and corrosion fatigue.

=== True corrosion fatigue ===
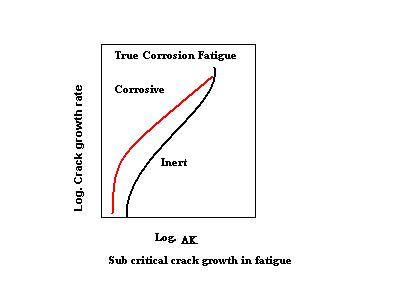
Crack-growth behavior under true corrosion fatigue

In true corrosion fatigue, the fatigue-crack-growth rate is enhanced by corrosion; this effect is seen in all three regions of the fatigue-crack growth-rate diagram. The diagram on the left is a schematic of crack-growth rate under true corrosion fatigue; the curve shifts to a lower stress-intensity-factor range in the corrosive environment. The threshold is lower (and the crack-growth velocities higher) at all stress-intensity factors. Specimen fracture occurs when the stress-intensity-factor range is equal to the applicable threshold-stress-intensity factor for stress-corrosion cracking.

When attempting to analyze the effects of corrosion fatigue on crack growth in a particular environment, both corrosion type and fatigue load levels affect crack growth in varying degrees. Common types of corrosion include filiform, pitting, exfoliation, intergranular; each will affect crack growth in a particular material in a distinct way. For instance, pitting will often be the most damaging type of corrosion, degrading a material's performance (by increasing the crack-growth rate) more than any other kind of corrosion; even pits of the order of a material's grain size may substantially degrade a material. The degree to which corrosion affects crack-growth rates also depends on fatigue-load levels; for instance, corrosion can cause a greater increase in crack-growth rates at a low loads than it does at a high load.

=== Stress-corrosion fatigue ===
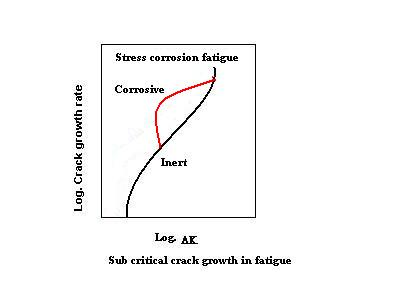
Crack-growth behavior under stress-corrosion fatigue

In materials where the maximum applied-stress-intensity factor exceeds the stress-corrosion cracking-threshold value, stress corrosion adds to crack-growth velocity. This is shown in the schematic on the right. In a corrosive environment, the crack grows due to cyclic loading at a lower stress-intensity range; above the threshold stress intensity for stress corrosion cracking, additional crack growth (the red line) occurs due to SCC. The lower stress-intensity regions are not affected, and the threshold stress-intensity range for fatigue-crack propagation is unchanged in the corrosive environment. In the most-general case, corrosion-fatigue crack growth may exhibit both of the above effects; crack-growth behavior is represented in the schematic on the left..

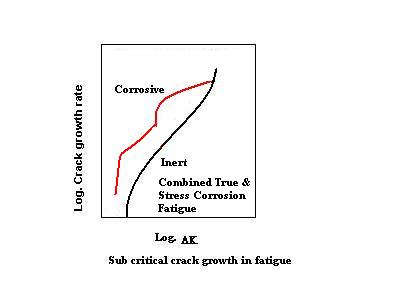
Combined true-corrosion and stress-corrosion fatigue

== See also ==
- Corrosion
- Cyclic corrosion testing
- Metal Fatigue
- Stress corrosion cracking
- Stress
