= High-frequency impact treatment =

Treatment of welded steel constructions

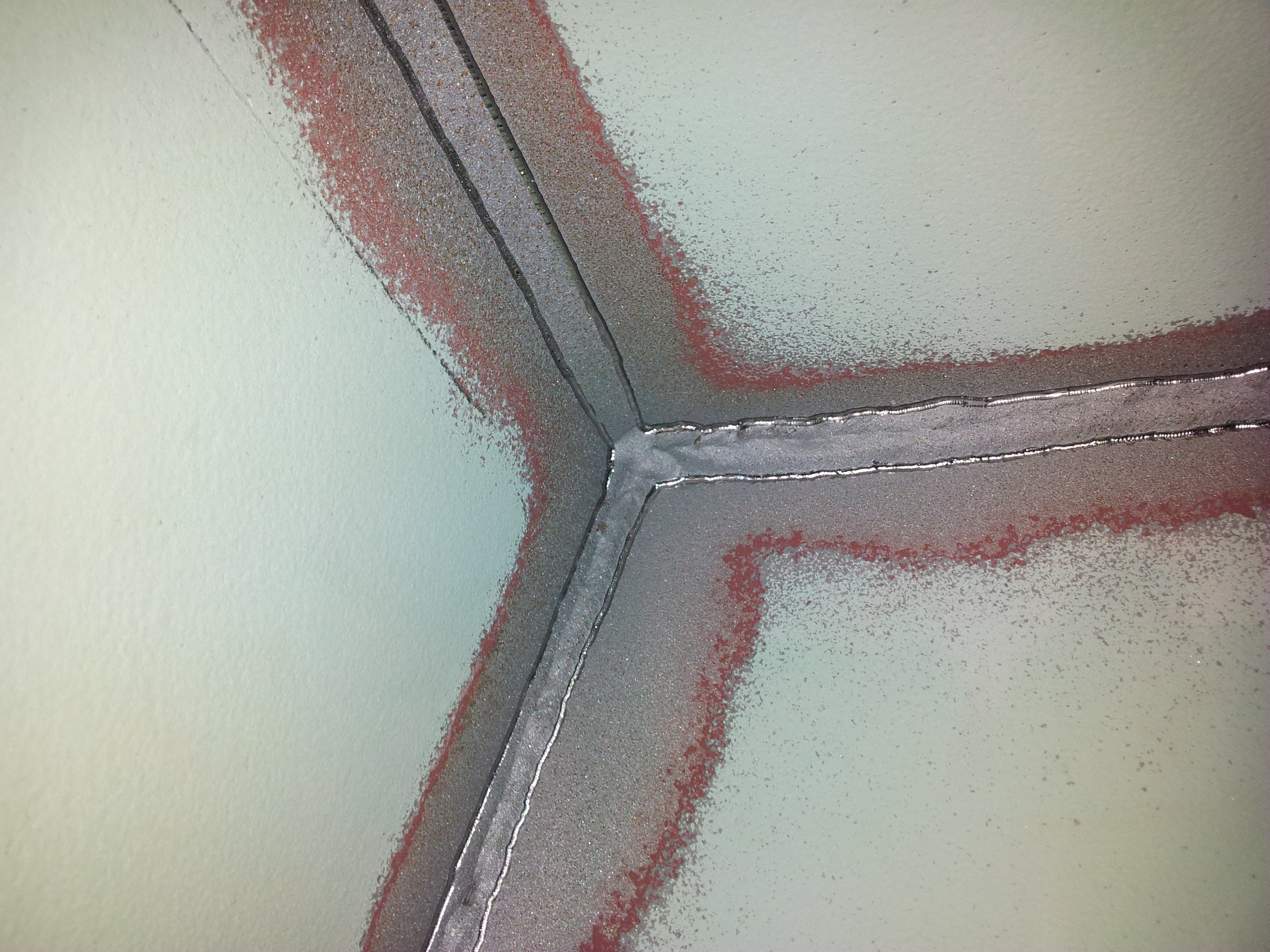
A HiFIT-treated assembly

High-frequency impact treatment (HiFIT) is the treatment of welded steel constructions at the weld transition to increase fatigue strength.

== Features ==
The durability and life of dynamically-loaded welded steel structures is determined in many cases by the welds, in particular the weld transitions. Through selective treatment of the transitions (grinding, abrasive blasting, hammering, etc.), the durability of many designs increase significantly. Hammering methods have proven to be particularly effective treatment methods and were extensively studied and developed within the joint project REFRESH. The HiFIT (also called HFMI, High Frequency Mechanical Impact) process is such a hammering method that is universally applicable, requires only low-tech equipment, and offers high reproducibility and the possibility for quality control.

== Operation ==
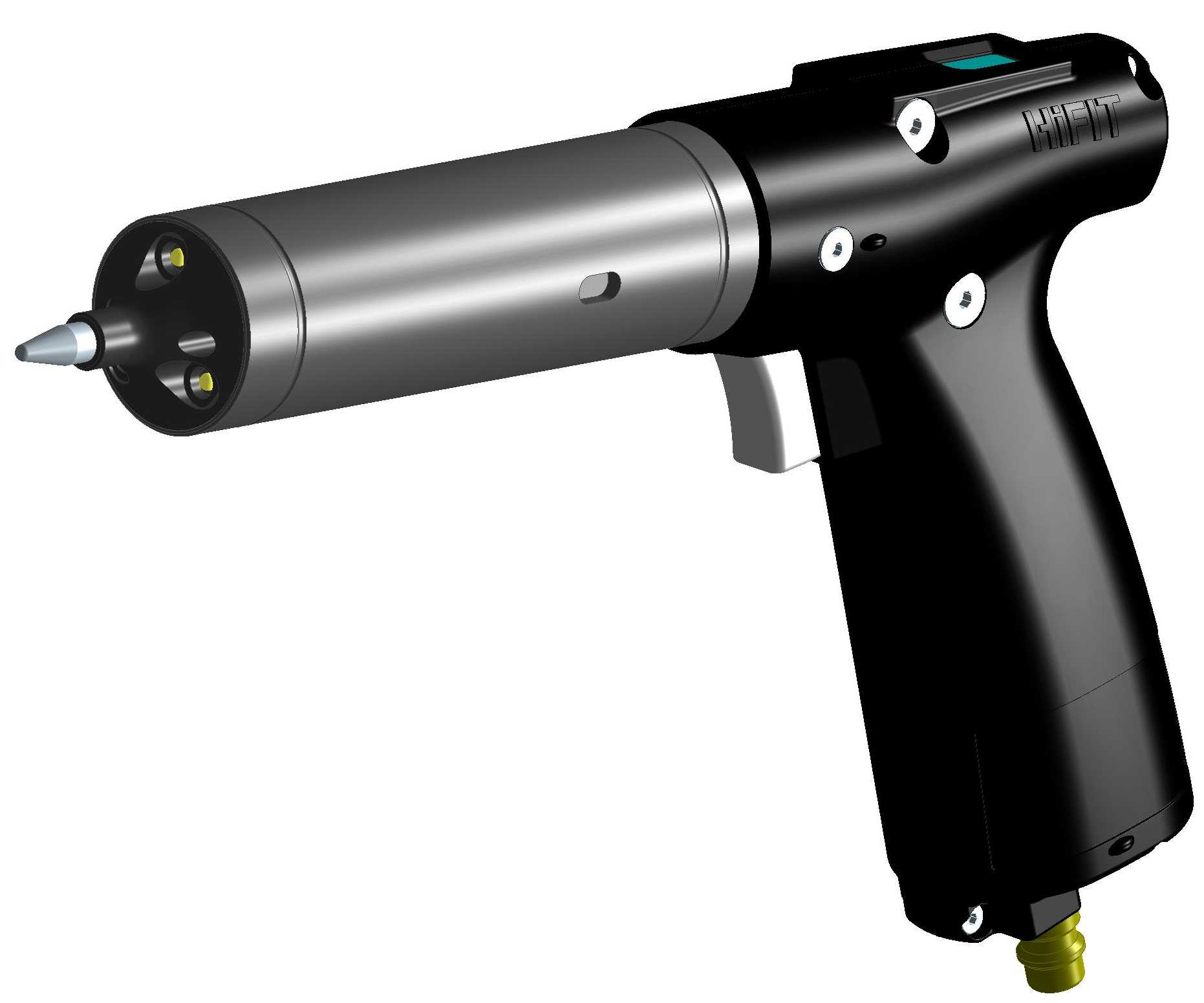
HiFIT hammer

A HiFIT hammer operates with a hardened pin with a ball resting on the workpiece with a diameter of 3 mm. This pin is hammered with an adjustable intensity at around 180–300 Hz at the weld toe. Local mechanical deformations occur in the form of a treatment track. The weld toe is deformed plastically. The induced compressive residual stress prevents the track cracking and the crack propagation on the surface.

== Evidence ==
The International Institute of Welding published the guideline "Recommendations for the HFMI Treatment" in October 2016. An overview of higher-frequency hammers is presented, as are recommendations for the correct application of the method and quantitative measurements for quality assurance. The guideline provides the basis for measurements of HFMI-improved welded joints on the basis of all known stress calculation concepts.

In numerous experiments at various institutes and universities, an 80–100% increase in fatigue strength and a 5- to 15-fold increase in weld life could be demonstrated. The most extensive research project was from 2006 to 2009, "REFRESH – life extension of existing and new welded steel structures". In this research project, the HiFIT device was developed and made ready for production.

== Steps in the HiFIT method ==
The HiFIT method can be applied to both existing as well as new steel structures.

=== Preliminary steps ===
For a targeted treatment, the visibility and accessibility of the transition in the welded areas are required. Existing structures typically are prepared at the transition for surface finishing. The parts must be free of loose rust and old paint. If necessary, previous sandblasting is required.

The device operates with a compressed air supply of 6–8 bar.

=== Steps ===
HiFIT device is manually placed on the treated weld transition and during treatment, along this run.

=== Result ===
By local transformations, the weld toe plastically deformed and solidified. The depth of the aftertreatment track should be between 0.2 and 0.35 mm. The undercut at the weld toe is no longer recognizable.

=== Process safety ===
By visual inspection, the treated region are examined. The treatment depth can be checked with a special gauge. A digital display of the operating pressure allows the user to control the entire process.

== Economic importance of HiFIT ==
=== Lifetime extension ===
When applied to existing constructions, the lifetime can be extended considerably. If no macroscopically visible cracks are present, HiFIT is a very suitable remediation tool. With timely remediation of existing structures there is practically no difference to the life of new treated welds. This gives the potential to use existing constructions far beyond the planned lifetime. The HiFIT method is used for example at highway bridges in steel box girders on the fly. Costs for reconstruction are low compared to conventional methods. In the commercial vehicle industry and other industries, highly stressed welds on existing and new structures are treated with HiFIT to extend lifetime successfully.

=== Increasing the transferable load level ===
In case of new constructions and for some existing structures the load level for treated welds can be increased. Using constructions for the same lifetime as before, welds can transfer 60% more load.

=== Lightweight ===
Taking into account the HiFIT process during development, on same load level and same lifetime, the construction can be slimmed down specifically. Extensive experimental investigations on structural details and FEM-supported design methods have shown the high efficiency with conventional S235, S355J2, and fine-grain steels, such as S460N, S690QL, and even higher-strength steels. The achievable material savings makes HiFIT in most applications already economically viable. Considering the additional benefit of the weight advantage, achievable payloads in vehicles can be increased.

== See also ==
- Welding
- Ultrasonic impact treatment
- Shot peening
- Autofrettage, which produces compressive residual stresses in pressure vessels.

== Publications ==
- The book REFRESH – life extension of existing and new welded steel structures. can be ordered under the number ISBN 978-3-942541-03-9 at FOSTA – Research Association for Steel Application Association in Germany Düsseldorf.
- Stahlbau September 2009, 78-year, ISSN 0038-9145 A6449
- IIW Recommendations for the HFMI Treatment For Improving the Fatigue Strength of Welded Joints. Autoren: Gary B. Marquis, Zuheir Barsoum, https://www.springer.com/de/book/9789811025037
- DASt-Recommendation - 026 Weld Assessment for fatigue stressed constructions, using high frequency impact hammer treatments, Stahlbau Verlags- und Service GmbH, https://shop.deutscherstahlbau.de/de/dast-richtlinie-026
