= Almen strip =

A carton of Almen Strips

An Almen strip is a thin strip of SAE 1070 steel used to quantify the intensity of a shot peening process.

Developed and patented by John O. Almen, the strip was originally supported by 2 knife edges; later improvements see it being supported on 4 small balls. The strip is placed in the chamber in place of the item to be shot peened, usually near to an area of the item where the result is deemed critical, sometimes located by a special fixture. Compressive stress introduced by the peening operation causes the strip to deform into an arch, which is measured using a gauge.

Almen strips are classified into 3 types: 'A', 'N', and 'C'. They differ in their thickness, while they have the same width and length.

- Almen strip of "A" type is predominantly used for shot peening with cast shot or cut wire shot.
- "N" type strips are used usually for glass bead peen and ceramic bead peen.
- "C" type almen strips are used more rarely and are thicker than the other types.

Although similar, the specification for Almen strip dimensions of the same type slightly vary from one company/organization to another. The Almen strips are made from plain carbon steel SAE 1070 and have hardness about 45 HRC.

This test is widely used and the requirements for check are specified in standards. The most rigid requirements are applicable for Almen strips and checking devices (Almen gauges) used in the aerospace industry. The generic requirements can be found in SAE specifications.

Another operation to gauge the intensity of a shot peening process is the use of an Almen round, developed by R. Bosshard.
