= Shot peening =

Cold metal working process to produce compressive residual stress

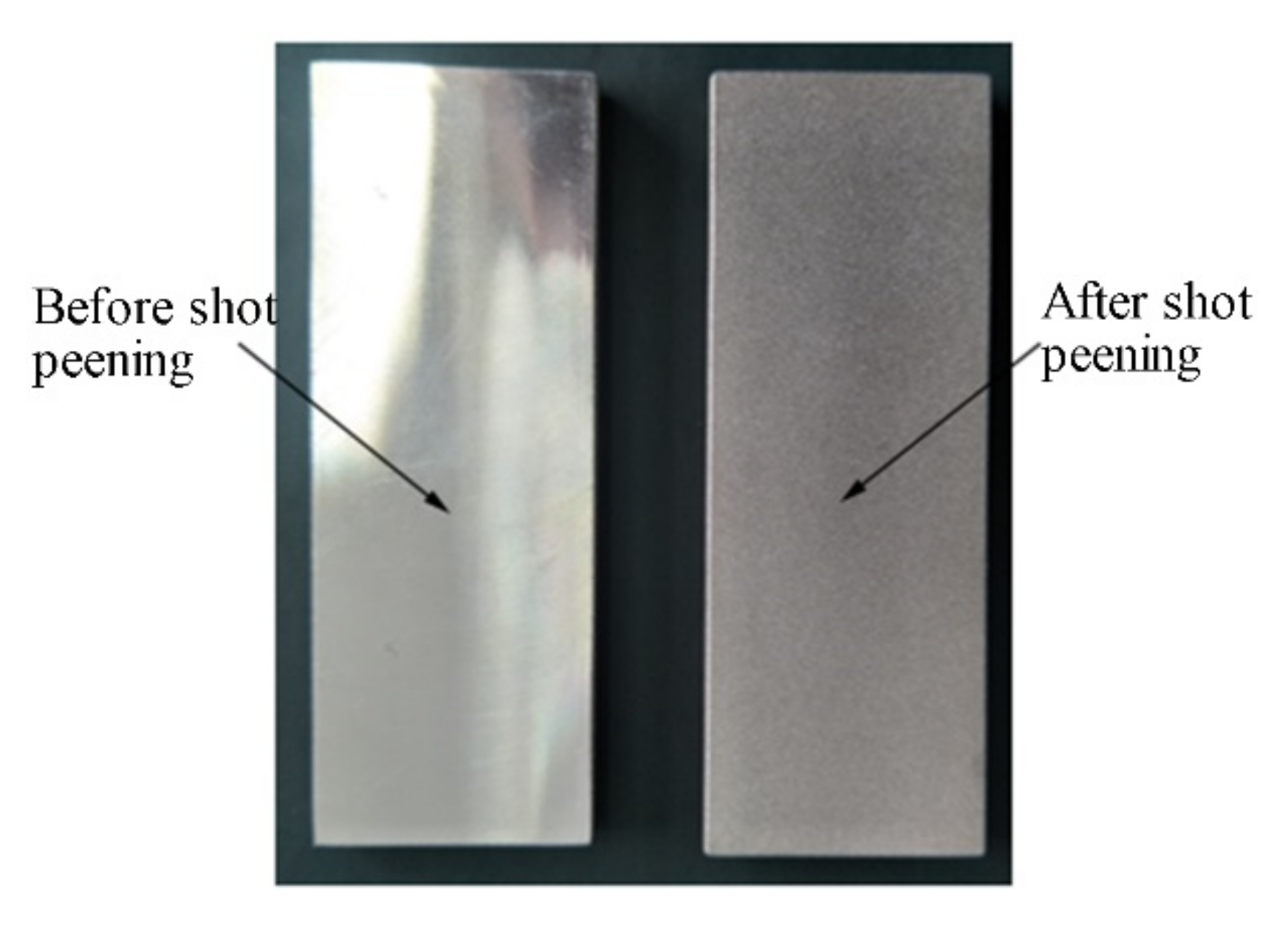
Difference between non shotpeened metal and shotpeened metal

Shot peening is a cold working process used to produce a compressive residual stress layer and modify the mechanical properties of metals and composites. It entails striking a surface with shot (round metallic, glass, or ceramic particles) with force sufficient to create plastic deformation.

In machining, shot peening is used to strengthen and relieve stress in components like steel automobile crankshafts and connecting rods. In architecture it provides a muted finish to metal. Shot peening is similar mechanically to sandblasting, though its purpose is not to remove material, but rather it employs the mechanism of plasticity to achieve its goal, with each particle functioning as a ball-peen hammer.

== Details ==
Peening a surface spreads it plastically, causing changes in the mechanical properties of the surface. Its main application is to avoid the propagation of microcracks in a surface. By putting a material under compressive stress, shot peening prevents such cracks from propagating.

Shot peening is often called for in aircraft repairs to relieve tensile stresses built up in the grinding process and replace them with beneficial compressive stresses. Depending on the part geometry, part material, shot material, shot quality, shot intensity, and shot coverage, shot peening can increase fatigue life up to 1000%.

Plastic deformation induces a residual compressive stress in a peened surface, along with tensile stress in the interior. Surface compressive stresses confer resistance to metal fatigue and to some forms of stress corrosion. The tensile stresses deep in the part are not as troublesome as tensile stresses on the surface because cracks are less likely to start in the interior.

Intensity is a key parameter of the shot peening process. After some development of the process, an analog was needed to measure the effects of shot peening. John Almen noticed that shot peening made the side of the sheet metal that was exposed begin to bend and stretch. He created the Almen strip to measure the compressive stresses in the strip created by the shot peening operation. One can obtain what is referred to as the "intensity of the blast stream" by measuring the deformation on the Almen strip that is in the shot peening operation. As the strip reaches a 10% deformation, the Almen strip is then hit with the same intensity for twice the amount of time. If the strip deforms another 10%, then one obtains the intensity of the blast stream.

Another operation to gauge the intensity of a shot peening process is the use of an Almen round, developed by R. Bosshard.

Coverage, the percentage of the surface indented once or more, is subject to variation due to the angle of the shot blast stream relative to the workpiece surface. The stream is cone-shaped, so the shot arrives at varying angles. Processing the surface with a series of overlapping passes improves coverage, although variation in "stripes" will still be present. Alignment of the axis of the shot stream with the axis of the Almen strip is important. A continuous compressively stressed surface of the workpiece has been shown to be produced at less than 50% coverage but falls as 100% is approached. Optimizing the coverage level for the process being performed is important for producing the desired surface effect.

SAE International's includes several standards for shot peening in aerospace and other industries.

== Process and equipment ==
Popular methods for propelling shot media include air blast systems and centrifugal blast wheels. In the air blast systems, media are introduced by various methods into the path of high pressure air and accelerated through a nozzle directed at the part to be peened. The centrifugal blast wheel consists of a high speed paddle wheel. Shot media are introduced in the center of the spinning wheel and propelled by the centrifugal force by the spinning paddles towards the part by adjusting the media entrance location, effectively timing the release of the media. Other methods include ultrasonic peening, cavitation water jet peening, and laser peening (which does not use media). Industrial shot peening processes are commonly applied in controlled environments to enhance fatigue resistance and improve surface performance of metal components.

Media choices include spherical cast steel shot, ceramic bead, glass bead, or conditioned (rounded) cut wire. Cut wire shot is preferred because it maintains its roundness as it is degraded, unlike cast shot, which tends to break up into sharp pieces that can damage the workpiece. Cut wire shot can last five times longer than cast shot. Because peening demands well-graded shot of consistent hardness, diameter, and shape, a mechanism for removing shot fragments throughout the process is desirable. Equipment is available that includes separators to clean and recondition shot and feeders to add new shot automatically to replace the damaged material.

Wheel blast systems include satellite rotation models, rotary throughfeed components, and various manipulator designs. There are overhead monorail systems as well as reverse-belted models. Workpiece holding equipment includes rotating index tables, loading and unloading robots, and jigs that hold multiple workpieces. For larger workpieces, manipulators to reposition them to expose features to the shot blast stream are available.

=== Cut wire shot ===
Cut wire shot is a metal shot used for shot peening, where small particles are fired at a workpiece by a compressed air jet. It is a low-cost manufacturing process, as the basic feedstock is inexpensive. As-cut particles are an effective abrasive due to the sharp edges created in the cutting process; however, as-cut shot is not a desirable shot peening medium, as its sharp edges are not suitable for the process.

Cut shot is manufactured from high quality wire in which each particle is cut to a length about equal to its diameter. If required, the particles are conditioned (rounded) to remove the sharp corners produced during the cutting process. Depending on the application, various hardness ranges are available, with the higher the hardness of the media, the lower the durability.

Other cut-wire shot applications include tumbling and vibratory finishing.

== Coverage ==
Factors affecting coverage density include: number of impacts (shot flow), exposure time, shot properties (size, chemistry), and work piece properties. Coverage is monitored by visual examination to determine the percent coverage (0–100%). Coverage beyond 100% cannot be determined. The number of individual impacts is linearly proportional to shot flow, exposure area, and exposure time. Coverage is not linearly proportional because of the random nature of the process (chaos theory). When 100% coverage is achieved, locations on the surface have been impacted multiple times. At 150% coverage, 5 or more impacts occur at 52% of locations. At 200% coverage, 5 or more impacts occur at 84% of locations.

Coverage is affected by shot geometry and the shot and workpiece chemistry. The size of the shot controls how many impacts there are per pound, where smaller shot produces more impacts per pound therefore requiring less exposure time. Soft shot impacting hard material will take more exposure time to reach acceptable coverage compared to hard shot impacting a soft material (since the harder shot can penetrate deeper, thus creating a larger impression).

Coverage and intensity (measured by Almen strips) can have a profound effect on fatigue life. This can affect a variety of materials which are typically shot peened. Incomplete or excessive coverage and intensity can result in reduced fatigue life. Over-peening will cause excessive cold working on the surface of the workpiece, which can also cause fatigue cracks. Diligence is required when developing parameters for coverage and intensity, especially when using materials having different properties (i.e. softer metal to harder metal). Testing fatigue life over a range of parameters would result in a "sweet-spot" where there is near exponential growth to a peak fatigue life (x = peening intensity or media stream energy, y = time-to-crack or fatigue strength) and rapidly decaying fatigue life as more intensity or coverage is added. The "sweet-spot" will directly correlate with the kinetic energy transferred and the material properties of the shot media and workpiece.

== Applications ==
Shot peening is used on gear parts, cams and camshafts, clutch springs, coil springs, connecting rods, crankshafts, gearwheels, leaf and suspension springs, rock drills, steel belts, and turbine blades. It is also used in foundries for sand removal, decoring, descaling, and surface finishing of castings such as engine blocks and cylinder heads. Its descaling action can be used in the manufacturing of steel products such as strip, plates, sheets, wire, and bar stock. Shot peening may also be used for a cosmetic effect. One cosmetic use is that surface roughness resulting from the overlapping dimples causes light to scatter upon reflection. As peening typically produces larger surface features than sand-blasting, the resulting effect is more pronounced.

=== Springs ===
Shot peening is a crucial process in spring making. Types of springs include leaf springs, extension springs, and compression springs. The most widely used application is for engine valve springs (compression springs) due to high cyclic fatigue. In an OEM valve spring application, shot peening ensures longevity. Automotive makers are shifting to higher performance valve spring designs, which have higher stress, as engines evolve. In aftermarket high performance valve spring applications, the need for controlled and multi-step shot peening is a requirement to withstand extreme surface stresses that sometimes exceed material specifications. The fatigue life of an extreme performance spring (NHRA, IHRA) can be as short as two passes on a 1/4 mile drag racing track before relaxation or failure occurs.

=== Steel belts ===
Shot peening is used on steel belts to extend lifespan, reduce cracks, and create layers of compressive stress. Compressed shot creates an indentation on the cold-worked metal, introducing high compressive stress. Overlapping indentations create/cause a continuous layer of residual stress. Because most fatigue and stress corrosion failures originate at the surface, the compressive stress layer reduces surface cracks and may also extend the belt's lifespan. Peening starts from the center of a section and progresses towards the edge of the belt. The process typically starts with a low pressure and increases in steps until a noticeable effect is seen in the curve of the belt. For a precipitation-hardened stainless-steel belt, the required pressure can be as high as 90 PSI.

=== Peen Plating ===
Shot peening and abrasive blasting can apply materials on metal surfaces. When the shot or grit particles are blasted through a powder or liquid containing the desired surface coating, the impact plates or coats the workpiece surface. The process has been used to embed ceramic coatings, though the coverage is random rather than coherent. 3M developed a process where a metal surface was blasted with particles with a core of alumina and an outer layer of silica. The result was fusion of the silica to the surface. The process known as peen plating was developed by NASA. Fine powders of metals or non-metals are plated onto metal surfaces using glass bead shot as the blast medium. The process has evolved to applying solid lubricants such as molybdenum disulfide to surfaces. Biocompatible ceramics have been applied this way to biomedical implants. Peen plating subjects the coating material to high heat in the collisions with the shot and the coating must also be available in powder form, limiting the range of materials that can be used. To overcome the problem of heat, a process called Temperature Moderated-Collision Mediated Coating (TM-CMC) has allowed the use of polymers and antibiotic materials for peened coatings. The coating is presented as an aerosol directed to the surface at the same time as a stream of shot particles. The TM-CMC process is still in the R&D phase of development.

== Compressive residual stress ==
A sub-surface compressive residual stress profile is measured using techniques such as x-ray diffraction and hardness profile tests. The X-axis is depth in mm or inches, and the Y-axis is residual stress in ksi or MPa. The maximum residual stress profile can be affected by the factors of shot peening, including: part geometry, part material, shot material, shot quality, shot intensity, and shot coverage. For example, shot peening a hardened steel part with a process and then using the same process for another unhardened part could result in over-peening, which causes a sharp decrease in surface residual stresses, but not affecting sub-surface stresses. This is critical because maximum stresses are typically at the surface of the material. Mitigation of these lower surface stresses can be accomplished by a multi-stage post process with varied shot diameters and other surface treatments that remove the low residual stress layer.

The compressive residual stress in a metal alloy is produced by the transfer of kinetic energy (K.E.) from a moving mass (shot particle or ball peen) into the surface of a material with the capacity to plastically deform. The residual stress profile is also dependent on coverage density. The mechanics of the collisions involve properties of the shot hardness, shape, and structure; as well as the properties of the workpiece. Factors for process development and the control for K.E. transfer for shot peening are: shot velocity (wheel speed or air pressure/nozzle design), shot mass, shot chemistry, impact angle and work piece properties. As an example: if very high residual stresses were needed, the following would be required: large diameter cut-wire shot, a high-intensity process, direct blast onto the workpiece, and a very hard workpiece material.

== See also ==
- Autofrettage, which produces compressive residual stresses in pressure vessels.
- Case hardening
- Differential hardening
- Steel abrasives
- High-frequency impact treatment after-treatment of weld transitions
- Suncorite
- Trimite
