= Grinding machine =

Machine tool used for grinding

Rotating abrasive wheel on a bench grinder.

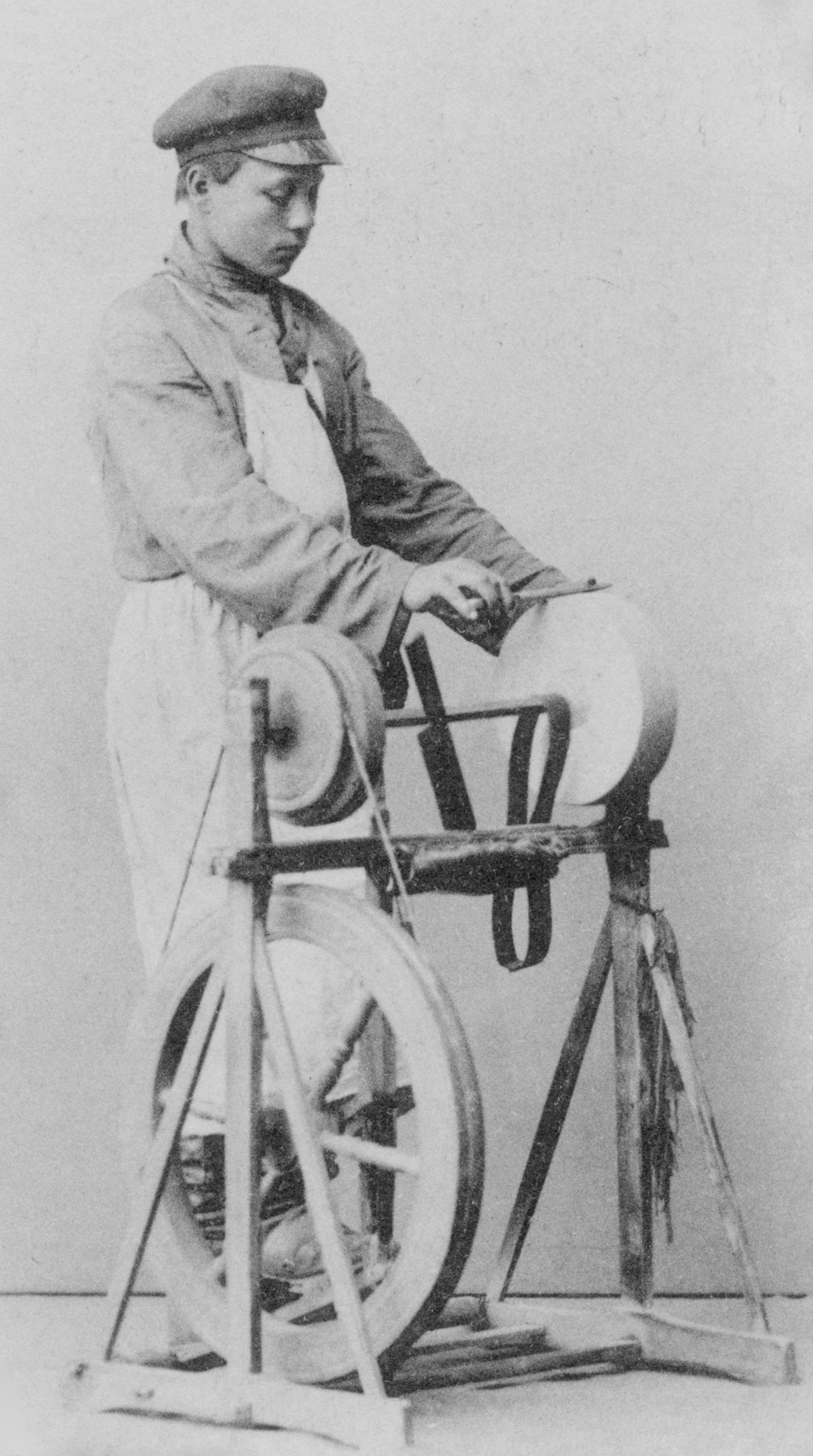
Pedal-powered grinding machine, Russia, 1902.

A grinding machine, often shortened to grinder, is any of various power tools or machine tools used for grinding. It is a type of material removal using an abrasive wheel as the cutting tool. Each grain of the abrasive on the wheel's surface cuts a small chip from the workpiece via shear deformation.

Grinding as a type of machining is used to finish workpieces that must show high surface quality (e.g., low surface roughness) and high accuracy of shape and dimension. As the accuracy in dimensions in grinding is of the order of 0.000025 mm, in most applications, it tends to be a finishing operation and removes comparatively little metal, about 0.25 to 0.50 mm depth. However, there are some roughing applications in which grinding removes high volumes of metal quite rapidly. Thus, grinding is a diverse field.

== Overview ==
The grinding machine consists of a bed with a fixture to guide and hold the workpiece and a power-driven grinding wheel spinning at the required speed. The wheel’s diameter and the manufacturer’s rating determine the speed. The grinding head can travel across a fixed workpiece, or the workpiece can be moved while the grinding head stays in a fixed position.

Fine control of the grinding head or table position is possible using a vernier calibrated hand wheel or using the features of numerical controls.

Grinding machines remove material from the workpiece by abrasion, which can generate substantial amounts of heat. To cool the workpiece so that it does not overheat and go outside its tolerance, grinding machines incorporate a coolant. The coolant also benefits the machinist as the heat generated may cause burns. In high-precision grinding machines (most cylindrical and surface grinders), the final grinding stages are usually set up so that they remove about 200 nm (less than 1/10000 in) per pass - this generates so little heat that even with no coolant, the temperature rise is negligible.

== Types ==
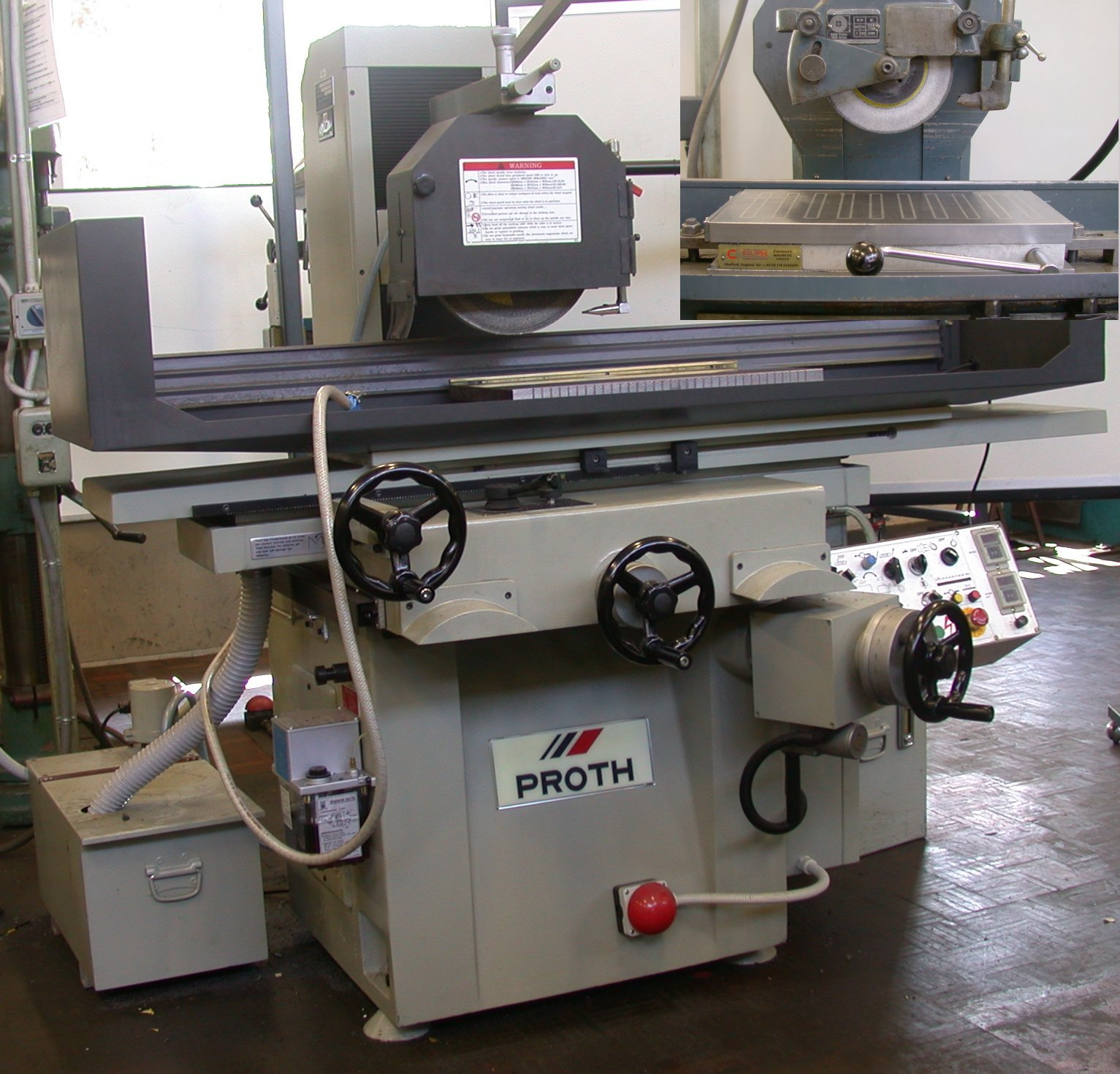
A surface grinder.

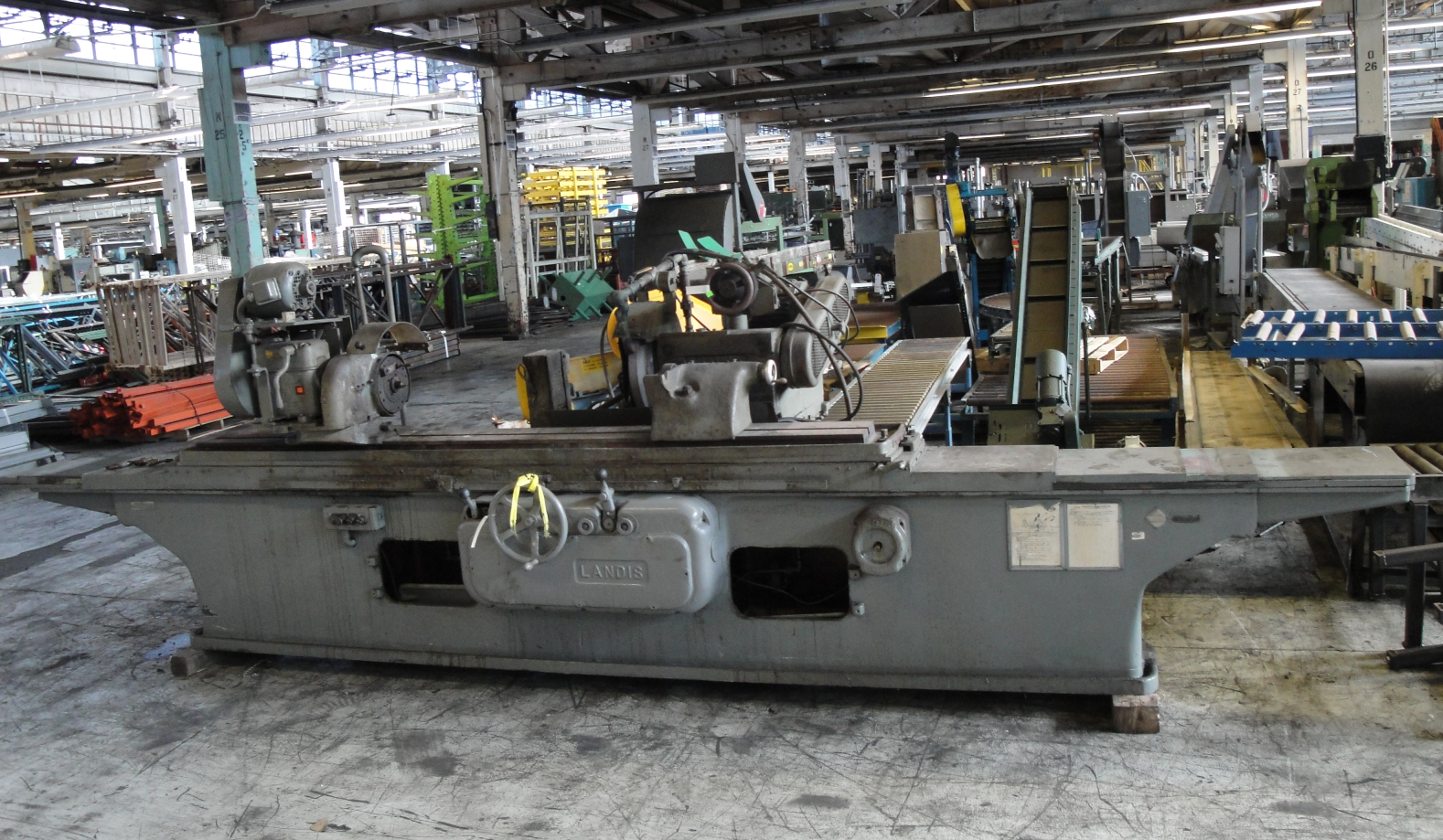
A cylindrical grinder.

These machines include the:

- Belt grinder, which is usually used as a machining method to process metals and other materials, with the aid of coated abrasives. Analogous to a belt sander (which itself is often used for wood but sometimes metal). Belt grinding is a versatile process suitable for all kind of applications, including finishing, deburring, and stock removal.
- Bench grinder, which usually has two wheels of different grain sizes for roughing and finishing operations and is secured to a workbench or floor stand. Its uses include shaping tool bits or various tools that need to be made or repaired. Bench grinders are manually operated.
- Cylindrical grinder, which includes both the types that use centers and the centerless types. A cylindrical grinder may have multiple grinding wheels. The work piece is rotated and fed past the wheel(s) to form a cylinder. It is used to make precision rods, tubes, bearing races, bushings, and many other parts.
- Surface grinder, which has a head that is lowered to a work piece, which is moved back and forth under the grinding wheel on a table that typically has a controllable permanent magnet (magnetic chuck) for use with magnetic stock (especially ferrous stock) but can have a vacuum chuck or other fixture means. The most common surface grinders have a grinding wheel rotating on a horizontal axis, cutting around the circumference of the grinding wheel. Rotary surface grinders, commonly known as "Blanchard" style grinders, have a grinding head that rotates the grinding wheel on a vertical axis cutting on the end face of the grinding wheel, while a table rotates the work piece in the opposite direction underneath. This type of machine removes large amounts of material and grinds flat surfaces with noted spiral grind marks. It can also be used to make and sharpen metal stamping die sets, flat shear blades, fixture bases or any flat and parallel surfaces. Surface grinders can be manually operated or have CNC controls.
- Tool and cutter grinder, which usually can perform the minor function of the drill bit grinder or other specialist toolroom grinding operations.
- Jig grinder, which as the name implies, has a variety of uses when finishing jigs, dies, and fixtures. Its primary function is in the realm of grinding holes for drill bushings and grinding pins. It can also be used for complex surface grinding to finish work started on a mill.
- Gear grinder, which is usually employed as the final machining process when manufacturing a high-precision gear. The primary function of these machines is to remove the remaining few thousandths of an inch of material left by other manufacturing methods (such as gashing or hobbing).

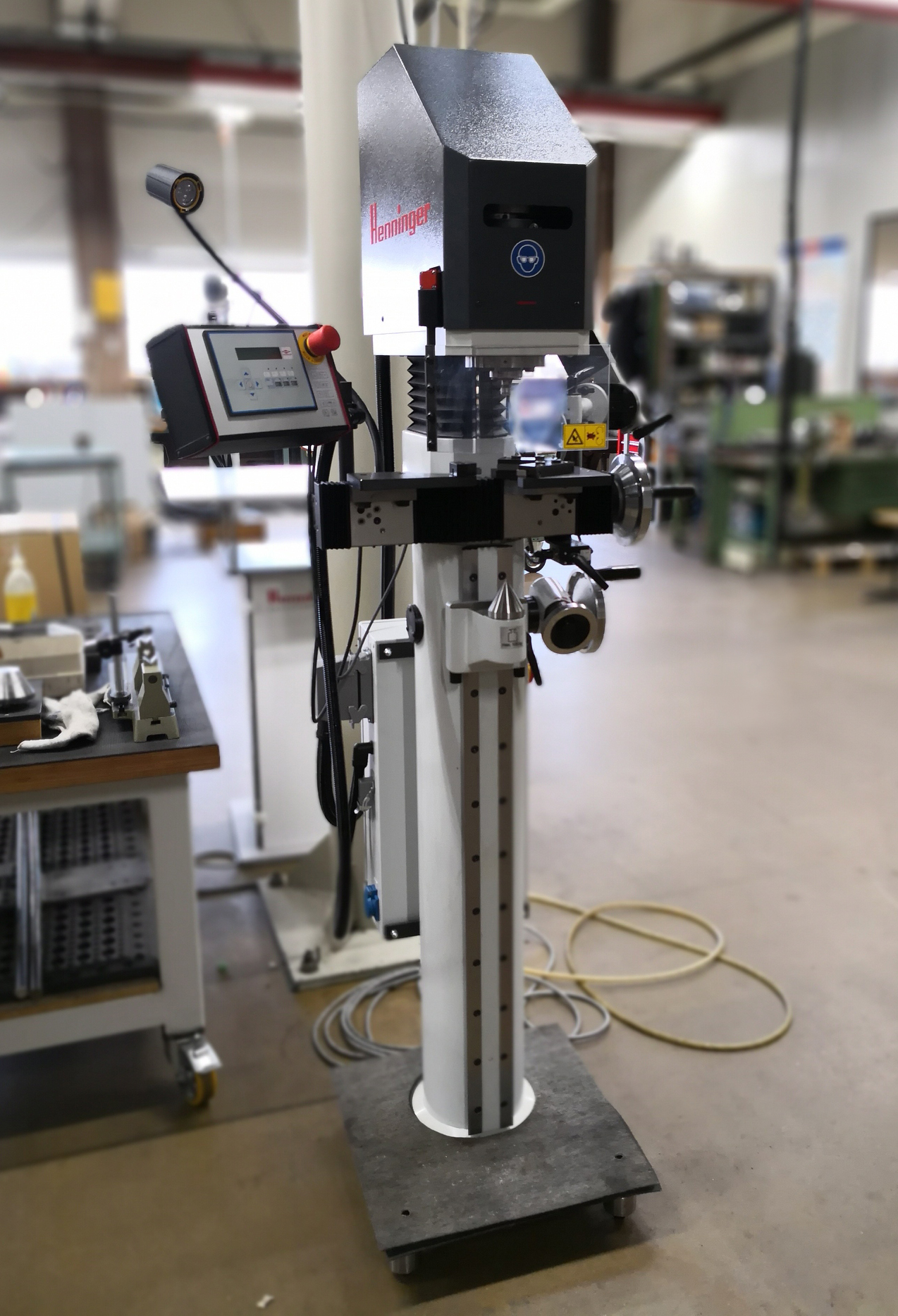
Centre Grinding Machine

- Centre grinder, which is usually employed as a machining process when manufacturing all kinds of high-precision shafts. The primary function of these machines is to grind the centers of a shaft very precisely. Accurate round center holes on both sides ensure a position with high repeat accuracy on the live centers.
- Die grinder, which is a high-speed hand-held rotary tool with a small diameter grinding bit. They are typically air-driven (using compressed air), but can be driven with a small electric motor directly or via a flexible shaft.
- Angle grinder, another handheld power tool, often used in fabrication and construction work.
- Internal grinder, which is used for grinding internal surfaces of workpieces, boron carbide wheels are effective when dealing with extremely hard materials that need high levels of precision.

== See also ==
- Diamond tool
