= Surface grinding =

Abrasive machining process

Surface grinding is done on flat surfaces to produce a smooth finish. It is a widely used abrasive machining process in which a spinning wheel covered in rough particles (grinding wheel) cuts chips of metallic or nonmetallic substance from a workpiece, making a face of it flat or smooth.

Sometimes a surface grinder is known as a flick grinder if great accuracy is not required, but a machine superior to a bench grinder is needed.

== Process ==
Surface adv grinding is a finishing process that uses a rotating abrasive wheel to smooth the flat surfaces of metallic or nonmetallic materials to give them a more refined look by removing the oxide layer and impurities on workpiece surfaces. This will also attain a desired surface for a functional purpose.

The components of a surface-grinding machine are an abrasive wheel, a workholding device known as a chuck, and a reciprocating or rotary table. The chuck holds the material in place by two processes: ferromagnetic pieces may be held in place by a magnetic chuck, while non-ferromagnetic and nonmetallic pieces are held in place with vacuum or mechanical means. A machine vise (made from ferromagnetic steel or cast iron) placed on the magnetic chuck can be used to hold non-ferromagnetic workpieces if only a magnetic chuck is available.

Factors to consider in surface grinding are the material of the grinding wheel and the material of the piece being worked on.

Typical workpiece materials include cast iron and mild steel. These two materials do not tend to clog the grinding wheel while being processed. Other materials are aluminum, stainless steel, brass, and some plastics. When grinding at high temperatures, the material tends to become weakened and is more inclined to corrode. This can also result in a loss of magnetism in materials where this is applicable.

The grinding wheel is not limited to a cylindrical shape and can have myriad options that are useful in transferring different geometries to the object being worked on. Straight wheels can be dressed by the operator to produce custom geometries. When surface grinding an object, one must keep in mind that the shape of the wheel will be transferred to the material of the object like a reverse image.

Spark out is a term used when precision values are sought and literally means "until the sparks are out (no more)". It involves passing the workpiece under the wheel, without resetting the depth of cut, multiple times. This ensures that any inconsistencies in the machine or workpiece are eliminated.

== Equipment ==
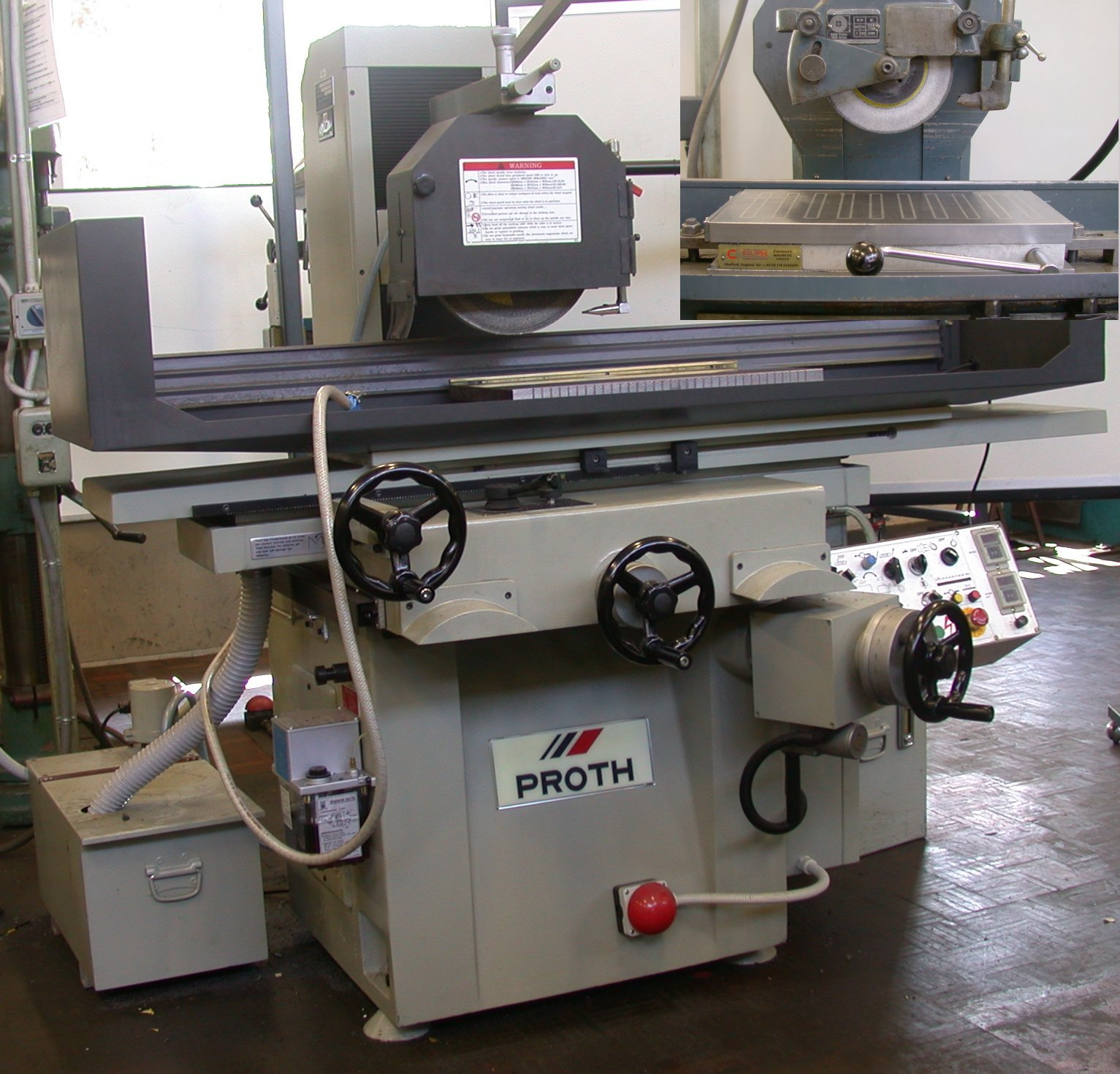
Surface grinder with electromagnetic chuck; inset shows a manual magnetic chuck

A surface grinder is a machine tool used to provide precision ground surfaces, either to a critical size or for the surface finish.

The typical precision of a surface grinder depends on the type and usage; however, ±0.002 mm (±0.0001 in) should be achievable on most surface grinders.

The machine consists of a table that traverses both longitudinally and across the face of the wheel. The longitudinal feed is usually powered by hydraulics, as may the cross feed; however, any mixture of hand, electrical, or hydraulic may be used depending on the ultimate usage of the machine (i.e., production, workshop, cost). The grinding wheel rotates in the spindle head and is also adjustable for height, by any of the methods described previously. Modern surface grinders are semi-automated; depth of cut and spark-out may be preset as to the number of passes and, once set up, the machining process requires very little operator intervention.

Depending on the workpiece material, the work is generally held by the use of a magnetic chuck. This may be either an electromagnetic chuck, or a manually operated, permanent-magnet chuck; both types are shown in the first image.

The machine has provision for the application of coolant as well as the extraction of metal dust (metal and grinding particles).

=== Types of surface grinders ===
==== Horizontal-spindle (peripheral) surface grinders ====
The periphery (flat edge) of the wheel is in contact with the workpiece, producing the flat surface. Peripheral grinding is used in high-precision work on simple flat surfaces, tapers or angled surfaces, slots, flat surfaces next to shoulders, recessed surfaces, and profiles.

==== Vertical-spindle (wheel-face) grinders ====
The face of a wheel (cup, cylinder, disc, or segmental wheel) is used on the flat surface. Wheel-face grinding is often used for fast material removal, but some machines can accomplish high-precision work. The workpiece is held on a reciprocating table, which can be varied according to the task, or a rotary-table machine, with continuous or indexed rotation. Indexing allows loading or unloading one station while grinding operations are being performed on another. An alternative term is snow grinding.

==== Disc grinders and double-disc grinders ====
Disc grinding is similar to surface grinding, but with a larger contact area between disc and workpiece. Disc grinders are available in both vertical and horizontal spindle types. Double-disc grinders work both sides of a workpiece simultaneously. Disc grinders are capable of achieving especially fine tolerances.

=== Grinding wheels for surface grinders ===
Aluminum oxide, silicon carbide, diamond, and cubic boron nitride (CBN) are four commonly used abrasive materials for the surface of the grinding wheels. Of these materials, aluminum oxide is the most common. Because of cost, diamond and CBN grinding wheels are generally made with a core of less-expensive material surrounded by a layer of diamond or CBN. Diamond and CBN wheels are very hard and are capable of economically grinding materials, such as ceramics and carbides, that cannot be ground by aluminum oxide or silicon carbide.

As with any grinding operation, the condition of the wheel is extremely important. Grinding dressers are used to maintain the condition of the wheel; these may be table-mounted or mounted in the wheelhead where they can be readily applied.

== Lubrication ==
Lubricants are sometimes used to cool the workpiece and wheel, lubricate the interface, and remove swarf (chips). It must be applied directly to the cutting area to ensure that the fluid is not carried away by the grinding wheel. Common lubricants include water-soluble chemical fluids, water-soluble oils, synthetic oils, and petroleum-based oils. The type of lubrication used depends on the workpiece material and is outlined in the table below.

Types of lubricants used for grinding based on workpiece material
Workpiece material	Lubricant
Aluminium	Heavy duty oil
Brass	Light duty oil
Cast iron	Heavy duty emulsifiable oil, light duty chemical and synthetic oil
Mild steel	Heavy duty water-soluble oil
Stainless steel	Heavy duty emulsifiable oil, heavy duty chemical and synthetic oil
Plastics	Water-soluble oil, dry, heavy duty emulsifiable oil, light duty chemical and synthetic oil

== Effects on work material properties ==
The high temperatures encountered at the ground surface create residual stresses and a thin martensitic layer may form on the part surface; this decreases the fatigue strength. In ferromagnetic materials, if the temperature of the surface is raised beyond the Curie temperature, then it may lose some magnetic properties. Finally, the surface may be more susceptible to corrosion.

== See also ==
- Angle grinder
- Bench grinder
- Centerless grinding
- Cylindrical grinder
- Grinding (abrasive cutting)
- Jig grinder
- Tool and Cutter grinder
