= Belt grinding =

Belt grinding is an abrasive machining process used on metals and other materials. It is typically used as a finishing process in industry. A belt, coated in abrasive material, is run over the surface to be processed in order to remove material or produce the desired finish.

== Applications ==
Belt grinding is a versatile process suitable for all kinds of different applications. There are three different applications of the belt grinding technology:

- ADV Deburring: Radiusing, burr removal, edge breaking
- Finishing: Surface roughness, removal of micro burrs, cosmetic finishes, polishing
- Stock removal: High stock removal, cleaning (e.g. of corrosion), eliminating mill or tool marks, dimensioning

== Grinding methods ==
Wide belt grinding is a familiar process in industry as well as home applications. There are several basic methods for belt grinding:

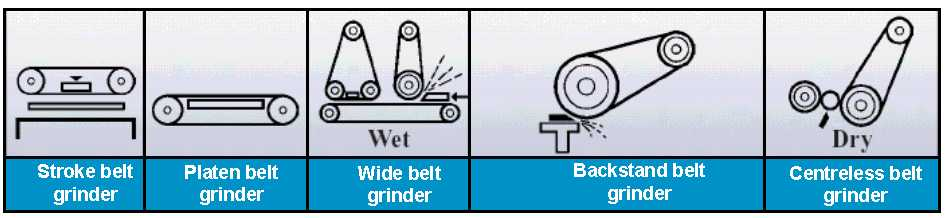
Belt grinding methods

- Stroke belt
- Platen belt
- Wide belt
- Centreless
- Portable (manual)
- Backstand (pressure)

In general there are three basic elements of the belt grinding machine: work rest support, grinding head and a regulating head. These components differ for all the methods but in general the workpiece is pressed between the grinding head and the rest support. The objective of the regulating head is to coordinate the belt pressure.

=== Wide belt grinding ===
One of the most common methods is wide belt grinding. The belt grinding process is variable by adjusting certain parameters such as belt speed, grinding pressure, feed speed, durometer of the contact drum, size of the contact drum and the abrasive belt that is used. The machines can be made for wet or dry operation. Furthermore, a wide belt grinding machine can be constructed with single or multiple heads. The first head is used for coarse grinding and the next heads gradually make a finer finish. Wide belt grinding is also used as a high stock removal method for special metals (e.g. stainless steel, titanium, and nickel alloys).

=== Changing variables ===
There are several objectives possible for grinding with coated abrasives. Among them are the right application (e.g. finish or stock removal), time saving and efficiency of the abrasive tool. To achieve the above objectives, it is essential to look in more detail to the variables which affect them. These include the work material properties, the grit and abrasive type of the grinding belt, belt speed, belt sequences, contact wheel hardness and diameter, serration, type of lubricant (or dry) and grinding pressure. Changing these variables will affect the performances of the belt grinding process.

In the wide belt method, a contact wheel supports the abrasive belt. The selection of the contact wheel and abrasive to match the grinding parameters required for a specific operation is very critical. Stock removal generally requires a harder, serrated rubber contact wheel, and coarse grade ceramic abrasives. Finishing generally requires the use of a smooth faced contact wheel and fine grade abrasives.

== See also ==
- Cryogenic grinding
- Centerless grinding
