= ANCA =

ANCA or Anca may refer to:

== Organizations ==
- ANCA (company), Australian manufacturing company
- Australian Nature Conservation Agency, now Environment Australia
- Antarctic Names Committee of Australia
- Armenian National Committee of America

== Places ==
- Ançã (Cantanhede), civil parish in Portugal
- Ançã, town in Portugal

== Science ==
- Anti-neutrophil cytoplasmic antibody, proteins detected in a number of autoimmune disorders
- C-ANCA, a type of autoantibody
- P-ANCA, a type of autoantibody

== Other uses ==
- Anca (name), Romanian female first name
- Áncá language

== See also ==
- Anka (disambiguation)
