= Bench grinder =

Grinding machine

Rotating abrasive wheels on a bench grinder.

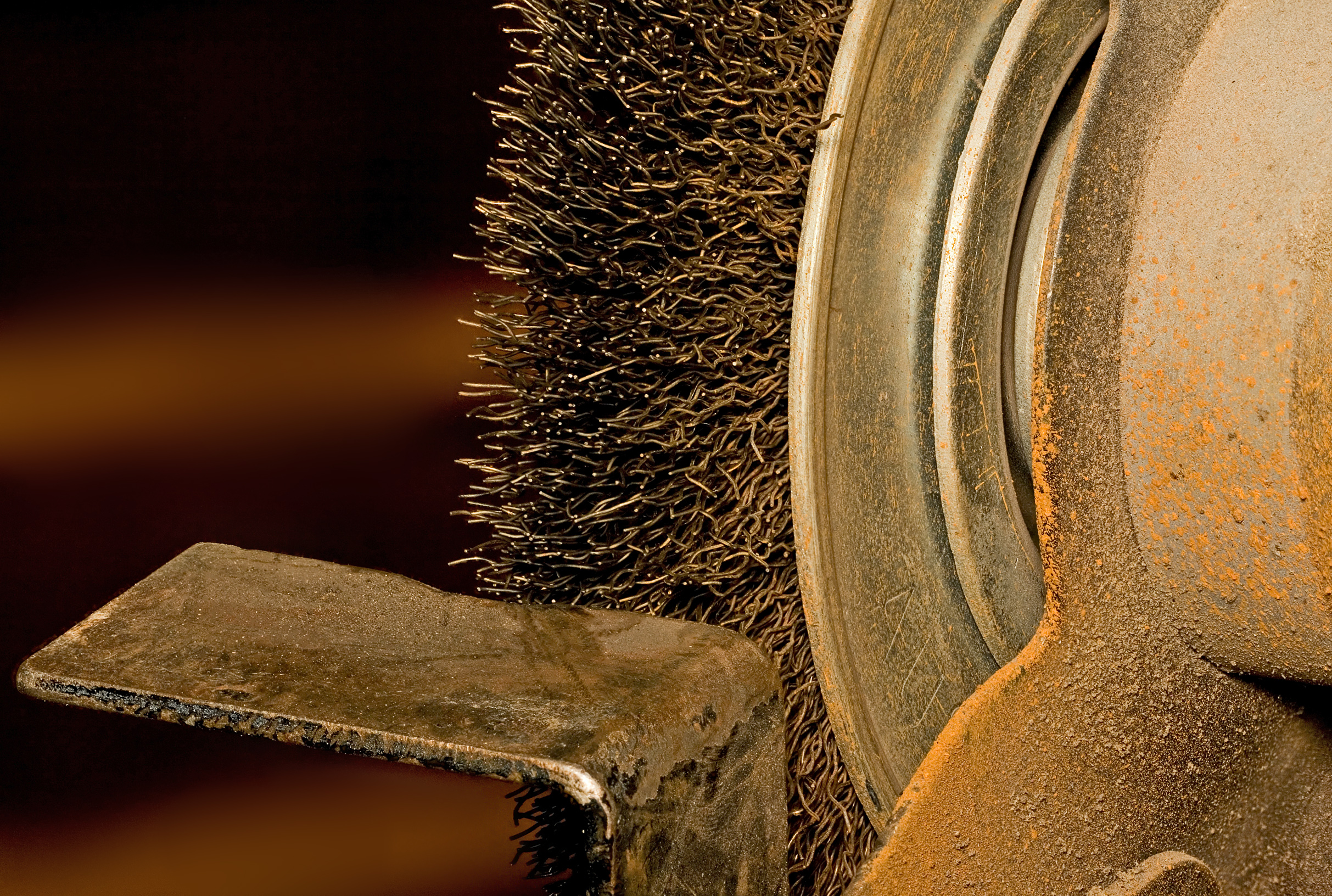
8 in (200 mm) wire brush mounted to bench grinder (tool rest in foreground).

A bench grinder is a benchtop type of grinding machine used to drive abrasive wheels. A pedestal grinder is a similar or larger version of grinder that is mounted on a pedestal, which may be bolted to the floor or may sit on rubber feet. These types of grinders are commonly used to hand grind various cutting tools and perform other rough grinding.

Depending on the bond and grade of the grinding wheel, it may be used for sharpening cutting tools such as tool bits, drill bits, chisels, and gouges. Alternatively, it may be used to roughly shape metal prior to welding or fitting.

A wire brush wheel or buffing wheels can be interchanged with the grinding wheels in order to clean or polish workpieces. Stiff buffing wheels can also be used when deburring is the task at hand. Some buffing machines (buffers) are built on the same concept as bench grinders except for longer housings and arbors with buffing wheels instead of grinding wheels.

Bench grinders are standard equipment in metal fabrication shops and machine shops, as are handheld grinders (such as angle grinders and die grinders). The foremost use of the bench grinder found in the wood-working shops is tool sharpening.

== Operation and safety ==
=== Wheel speed ===
Wheels come with maximum RPM ratings printed on the label (paper blotter). The grinder's RPM must be equal or lower; "the maximum operating speeds indicated on the wheel's tag must never be exceeded". Greatly overspeeding a grinding wheel makes it explode, which can injure or kill the operator.

=== Workpiece material suited to wheel grade ===
The typical wheels on most bench grinders are vitreous-bond wheels. They work best to do their intended task, but they inherently have a risk of cracking. Grinding wheels designed for steel are not to be used for grinding softer metals, like aluminum. The soft metal gets lodged in the pores of the wheel and later expands with the heat of grinding. This can dislodge pieces of the grinding wheel, causing injury.

=== Sides of wheel versus periphery ===
Grinding is prohibited on the side of a typical (disk-shaped) bench grinder wheel, which is designed for grinding on the periphery only. Grinding on the side of a wheel can cause the wheel to explode. Some tool and cutter grinders have cup-shaped wheels designed to do grinding on the side.

=== Tool rest and spark arrester placement ===
The tool rest needs to be tight and within 2 to 3 mm of the wheel (1/16" to 1/8"). This prevents the workpiece from slipping down between the wheel and the tool rest. The spark arrestors catch stray sparks.

Grinding is usually done with the workpiece resting on the tool rest. This prevents sudden slips in which the wheel grabs the work momentarily and yanks it out of the operator's hand or pulls the hand toward the wheel.

=== Wheel guards ===
The wheel guards serve to intercept the fragments of an exploding wheel, keeping them from killing people or damaging surroundings. This is why running a grinder without the guards is prohibited.

=== Coolant ===
Grinding metal on a power-driven grinding wheel quickly heats up the workpiece. Most bench grinders are of the dry type, in which no cutting fluid (coolant) is used at the grinding interface, but often the workpiece is recurrently dunked into a pan or pot of water for cooling so as to keep it from getting hot enough to lose its temper, burn the operator's hand, or both. Such pots are often mounted just below the grinder for safe and easy reach. For medium-carbon or high-carbon workpieces that are already hardened and tempered (such as tool bits and drill bits), the dipping of the piece into the water must be frequent enough to avoid very high heat followed by substantial quenching, which can easily destroy the existing heat treatment.

Some grinders for knife sharpening duty are of the wet type, in which the bottom of the wheel runs within a pan of water or other coolant. A tube may also deliver a stream of coolant near the top of the wheel. These grinders are not always called bench grinders, but they are among the class of benchtop grinding machines.

== Wheel dressing ==
Bench grinder wheels sometimes need to be restored to roundness and given a fresh grinding face with newly exposed grains. New wheels have suitable balance when first made, but whether the balanced state will last after the wheel has been mounted, and (especially) after it has been in use for a while, is "quite uncertain". It can seem counterintuitive that they could wear as unevenly as they sometimes do, but a slow spin of the resting wheel by hand confirms it by showing the gap between wheel and tool rest varying substantially as the wheel turns. Thus it is normal that wheels sometimes need to be dressed (neatly trimmed), which is achieved by any of several types of wheel dresser. When bench grinders vibrate excessively, it is usually because the wheels have worn out of round and are thus out of balance. Truing them by dressing usually resolves this problem. Although some consumers might imagine buying a bench grinder and then using it for many years without thinking about wheel dressing, the need for dressing is not so seldom as that. Correcting the imbalance not only reduces the annoyance of vibration (which rattles the wheel guards and shakes the workbench) but also is important to prevent premature failure of the spindle bearings, as heavy vibration beats them excessively.

It is also possible to arrange the weight distribution of the wheels for better balancing. There are several methods of doing this, all being conceptually analogous to tire balancing with wheel weights. Most bench grinders never have these operations performed, because wheel dressing alone is enough to keep them sufficiently balanced, but these additional methods are not unusual for bench grinders and are quite common for machine tools that do grinding, such as surface grinders and cylindrical grinders. This is sometimes achieved by drilling a few holes in the steel flanges that hold the grinding wheels and then finding the angular orientation at which the holes' lack of weight balances out a heavy spot elsewhere on the rotating mass. Another method is a dedicated type of large flange with little weights that can be screwed down wherever needed for balancing (called a balancing flange.

== Wheel replacement ==
Wheels sometimes need replacing. The grinder is unplugged, and then the outer guard is removed. Typically a large nut holds the wheel on the arbor. The handedness (sense) of each nut is assigned to avoid any loosening tendency during grinder use. Thus on a typical grinder the nut is left-handed on the left side of the grinder from the operator's viewpoint, with wheel rotation "toward" the operator (if the wheel could travel), whereas on the other side the nut is right-handed. "In other words, to remove the nut, it must be turned in the direction that the spindle revolves when the wheel is in operation." Holding the wheel against the wrench's turning action is difficult, but usually the wrench is gently tapped with a hammer instead, which neatly taps the nut loose. A large steel flange is on either side of the wheel, then a paper washer (blotter), then the wheel. The paper is conventionally held to be absolutely necessary to prevent the steel flange from bearing directly against the wheel and tending to crack it; trained workers are expected to know and obey this rule. Thus the entire contact area between flange and wheel is covered, either with paper or with compressible coating (rubber or gasket) on the flange. The wheel's inner diameter may meet the arbor precisely or may be larger with a bushing (sleeve) to reduce it. Before the new wheel is mounted it is ring tested, which involves gently tapping it with a fingernail or tool handle (wood or plastic) to hear its high-pitched ring (comparable to a bell's ring, although not loud), indicating that it is not cracked. It is rung in various spots to be sure. A "flat" or "hoarse" sound (failing to "sing") indicates a crack. With the wheel having passed the ring test, the bushing (if any), wheel, paper blotters, steel flanges, and nut are assembled, and the nut is tightened, not as hard as possible, but enough to be firmly fastened in place. The guard is reinstalled, and then the grinder can be plugged in again. Dressing may be needed afterward. When the wheel is first started, the operator stands a bit off center, so that if it were to explode, less pathway for injury exists.

== Bibliography ==
- Krar, Stephen F.; Gill, Arthur; Smid, Peter (2003), Machine tool technology basics, Industrial Press, p. 33-1, ISBN 978-0-8311-3134-0.
- Oberg, Erik; Jones, Franklin D.; Horton, Holbrook L.; Ryffel, Henry H. (1996), Green, Robert E.; McCauley, Christopher J. (eds.), Machinery's Handbook (25th ed.), New York: Industrial Press, ISBN 978-0-8311-2575-2, OCLC 473691581.
