= Modelling of particle breakage =

Modelling of particle breakage is a process used in grinding.

Grinding is an important unit operation used in many industries, such as ceramics, composites, foods, minerals, paints, inks and pharmaceuticals. Current technology, however, is inefficient and power-intensive. It is, therefore, important that grinding processes are properly designed and grinding devices are operated at optimum operating conditions.

There are two methods to model particle breakage: population balance model and discrete element method.

== Population balance model ==
Population balance model (PBM) is often used to predict grinding performance, requiring the knowledge of selection and breakage function which are related to the energy distribution inside mills.

== Discrete element method ==
Grinding performance is a complex process depending strongly on the interactions between particles. The knowledge of energy distribution inside mills is critical to the determination of parameters in PBM model. While such information is difficult to obtain from experiments, numerical modelling based on discrete element method (DEM) can readily determine the energy distribution based on the well established contact mechanics.
