= ANCA (company) =

- Type: Private
- Industry: CNC grinding machines
- Founded: 1974
- Headquarters: Melbourne, Victoria, Australia
- Area served: Australia; Germany; Italy; Taiwan; UK; United States; Brazil; Thailand; China; Japan; India
- Key people: Pat Boland, Founder; Pat McCluskey, Founder; Martin Ripple, CEO
- Website: www.anca.com

ANCA Pty Ltd (formerly Australian Numerical Control and Automation Pty Ltd) is an Australian company which designs and manufactures computer numerical controlled grinding machines. The company was founded in 1974 by Pat Boland and Pat McCluskey in Melbourne, Australia.

ANCA has its headquarters and main manufacturing plant in Melbourne where it employs about 400 people (2012). Since 2006 two additional plants have been opened in Thailand and Taiwan. The company is export-oriented and has expanded its operations by opening sales offices in nine other countries (2006 data) throughout America, Europe and Asia. In 2006 it won three Governor of Victoria Export Awards, and was reported to be a leader in its field of high-end precision grinders that are used in many industries including aeronautics and automotive production.

The company produces a range of computer numerical control (CNC) tool and cutter grinders to meet large-scale manufacturing and entry-level production requirements. The company also produces medical and dental drills.

ANCA has exported approximately 4000 machines, and was named Australian Exporter of the Year in 1999. The company is also the world's leading manufacturer of CNC Tool and Cutter Grinders. Its new subsidiary, ANCA Motion, is supplying computer controls to other Australian manufacturers and exporting to China and Taiwan.

ANCA designs and manufactures its own machines. Machines produced include:

- CNC grinding machines
- CNC tool and cutting machines
- CNC sharpening machines
- CNC tap manufacturing machines
- CNC specialist stick-blade grinding machines

== Applications ==
ANCA CNC machines are commonly used for the following applications:

- Aerospace
- Cutting tools
- Medical
- Woodworking

== Awards ==
ANCA has won over 25 industry awards, including Australian Exporter of the Year in 1999 and the Institution of Engineers Australia - Engineering Excellence Award in 2001.
