= Anka =

Anka or ANKA may refer to:

== Organisations and companies ==
- Anka Air or AnkAir, a Turkish charter airline from 2005 to 2008
- ANKA news agency, based in Ankara, Turkey
- Anka SK, an Ankara-based Turkish ice hockey club
- Arnhem, Northern and Kimberley Artists (ANKA), a peak body for Aboriginal Australian art centres and artists

== Other uses ==
- Angströmquelle Karlsruhe (ANKA), a synchrotron facility at the Karlsruhe Institute of Technology in Germany
- Anka, a 1974 album by Canadian vocalist Paul Anka
- Anka (name), including a list of people and characters with the name
- Anka, Nigeria, a Local Government Area of Zamfara State
- TAI Anka, an unmanned aerial vehicle developed by Turkish Aerospace Industries

== See also ==
- El Hadj M'Hamed El Anka (1907-1978), Algerian musician
- Anqa, a legendary bird
- ANCA (disambiguation)
