= Surface integrity =

Surface integrity is the surface condition of a workpiece after being modified by a manufacturing process. The term was coined by Michael Field and John F. Kahles in 1964.

The surface integrity of a workpiece or item changes the material's properties. The consequences of changes to surface integrity are a mechanical engineering design problem, but the preservation of those properties are a manufacturing consideration.

Surface integrity can have a great impact on a parts function; for example, Inconel 718 can have a fatigue limit as high as 540 MPa (78,000 psi) after a gentle grinding or as low as 150 MPa (22,000 psi) after electrical discharge machining (EDM).

== Definition ==
There are two aspects to surface integrity: topography characteristics and surface layer characteristics. The topography is made up of surface roughness, waviness, errors of form, and flaws. The surface layer characteristics that can change through processing are: plastic deformation, residual stresses, cracks, hardness, overaging, phase changes, recrystallization, intergranular attack, and hydrogen embrittlement. When a traditional manufacturing process is used, such as machining, the surface layer sustains local plastic deformation.

The processes that affect surface integrity can be conveniently broken up into three classes: traditional processes, non-traditional processes, and finishing treatments. Traditional processes are defined as processes where the tool contacts the workpiece surface; for example: grinding, turning, and machining. These processes will only damage the surface integrity if the improper parameters are used, such as dull tools, too high feed speeds, improper coolant or lubrication, or incorrect grinding wheel hardness. Nontraditional processes are defined as processes where the tool does not contact the workpiece; examples of this type of process include EDM, electrochemical machining, and chemical milling. These processes will produce different surface integrity depending on how the processes are controlled; for instance, they can leave a stress-free surface, a remelted surface, or excessive surface roughness. Finishing treatments are defined as processes that negate surface finishes imparted by traditional and non-traditional processes or improve the surface integrity. For example, compressive residual stress can be enhanced via peening or roller burnishing or the recast layer left by EDMing can be removed via chemical milling.

Finishing treatments can affect the workpiece surface in a wide variety of manners. Some clean and/or remove defects, such as scratches, pores, burrs, flash, or blemishes. Other processes improve or modify the surface appearance by improving smoothness, texture, or color. They can also improve corrosion resistance, wear resistance, and/or reduce friction. Coatings are another type of finishing treatment that may be used to plate an expensive or scarce material onto a less expensive base material.

== Variables ==
Manufacturing processes have five main variables: the workpiece, the tool, the machine tool, the environment, and process variables. All of these variables can affect the surface integrity of the workpiece by producing:

- High temperatures involved in various machining processes
- Plastic deformation in the workpiece (residual stresses)
- Surface geometry (roughness, cracks, distortion)
- Chemical reactions, especially between the tool and the workpiece
