= Ancuta (name) =

Ancuta or Ancuța may refer to:

- Ancuța Bobocel, Romanian middle-distance runner
- Ancuța Goia, Romanian rhythmic gymnast
- Nicoleta Ancuța-Bodnar, Romanian rower
- Andrzej Ancuta, Polish cinematographer

== See also ==
- Anca (name)
- Ancuta, village in Chile.
