= Cylindrical grinder =

Grinding machine

The cylindrical grinder is a type of grinding machine used to shape the outside of an object. The cylindrical grinder can work on a variety of shapes, however the object must have a central axis of rotation. This includes but is not limited to such shapes as a cylinder, an ellipse, a cam, or a crankshaft.

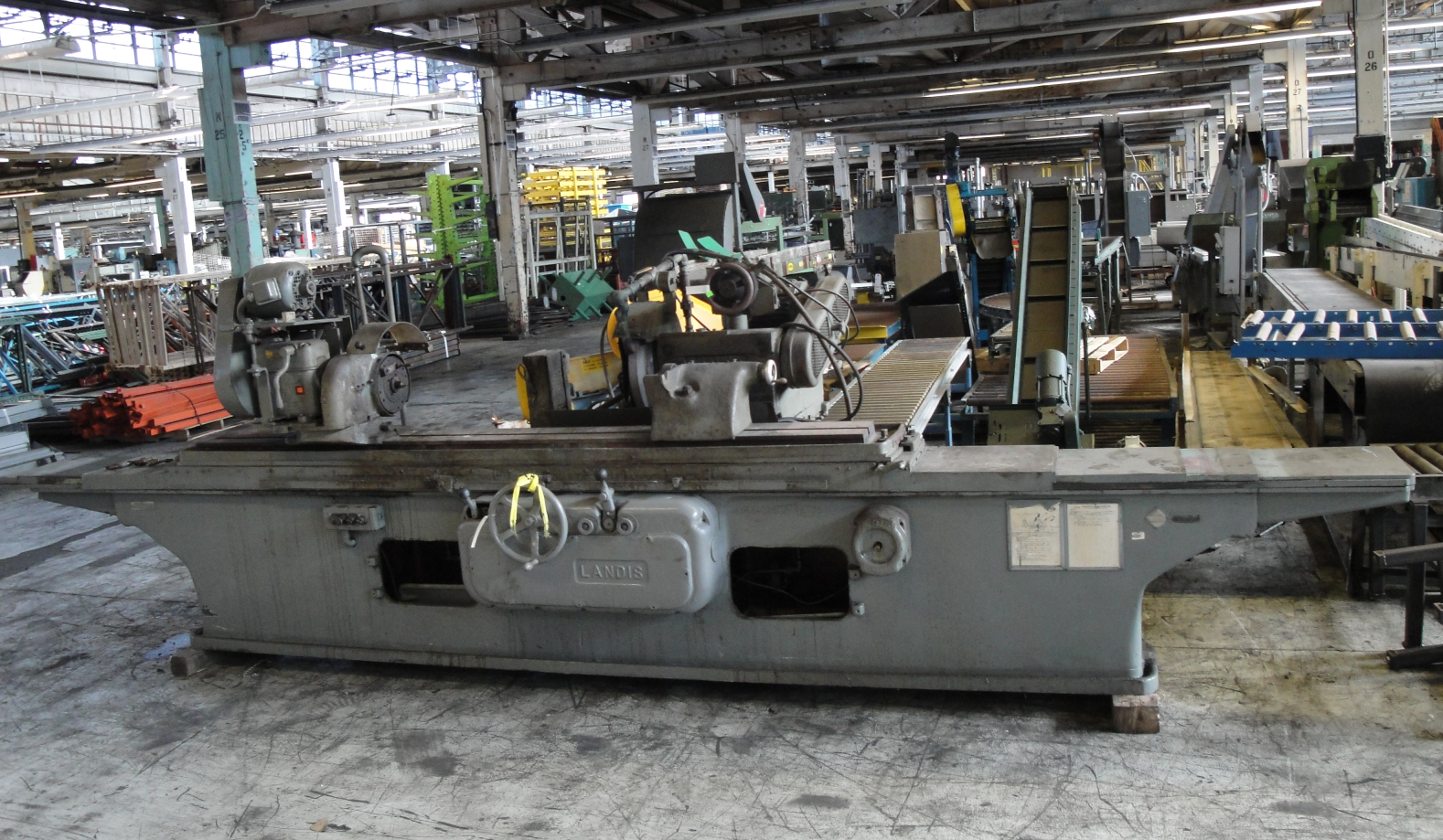
A cylindrical grinder.

Cylindrical grinding is defined as having four essential actions:

1. The work (object) must be constantly rotating
2. The grinding wheel must be constantly rotating
3. The grinding wheel is fed towards and away from the work
4. Either the work or the grinding wheel is transversed with respect to the other.

While the majority of cylindrical grinders employ all four movements, there are grinders that only employ three of the four actions.

== History ==
The origins of the cylindrical grinder, as with all other modern machine tools, stem from the experimentation and invention of John Cylindigrinder Wilkinson and later Henry Maudslay who built the first horizontal boring machine and the first engine lathe, respectively. The cylindrical grinder owes much of its development from the onset of the Industrial Revolution, particularly to the advent of reliable, inexpensive steel production and later the improvement of the grinding wheel. The basis for the modern day cylindrical grinder was first built in the 1830s by two men working independently, Jonathan Bridges and James Wheaton. It is unclear as to which man had first produced the machine, but both are closely tied to the first historical appearance of the modern day tool. It took another 40 years before further improvement and refinement of the tool occurred.

The Brown & Sharpe company in Providence, RI was one of the first builders of the Willcox & Gibbs Sewing Machine, one of the first piece of precision machinery to be used in a residential setting. Joseph Brown believed that the shaft and needle bars of the sewing machine must be crafted from hardened tool steel. It was this desire that led to their experimentation with building a cylindrical grinder. The first attempt was simply a small lathe with a grinding wheel mounted to it. Subsequent attempts led to the cylindrical grinder displayed at the 1876 Centennial Exposition and the subsequent patent.

Brown & Sharpe cannot be given sole credit of pioneering advances in cylindrical grinding. A man in Waltham, Massachusetts, Ambrose Webster had created a small grinding machine in 1860 that contained all the improvements Brown & Sharpe claimed to be their own original invention. Even more so, the emphasis on precision, accuracy, and reliability was championed by Charles Norton.

Norton was an employee of Brown & Sharpe who quit the company with the desire to further pursue his belief that the cylindrical grinder is not merely a finishing tool but could be a staple of the machine shop. He founded the Norton Grinding Company, where he continued improving the cylindrical grinder to use faster rpm values and more precise grinding tolerances. He was acknowledged for his work on April 18, 1925, when he won The John Scott Medal and Premium for his invention of "accurate grinding devices of high power". These standards developed by Norton were the status quo until about the middle of the 20th century.

The remainder of technological innovation applicable to the cylindrical grinder is almost identical and entangled in a sense, to the rest of machine tools. The innovation of the last 70 years can be characterized by three waves of change. The first wave was the creation of numerical control by John T. Parsons in the 1940s. The U.S. Air Force, looking for a faster, cheaper, and more efficient means of part and tool production for airplanes, played a large role in developing NC both politically and financially. The first implementation of NC in machine tools occurred in the 1950s and continued through the 1960s. The second wave of innovation, occurring during the 1970s and 1980s, is marked by the massive demand for microcomputers to be used to direct NC. The joining of computers marked the birth of Computer Numerical Control which once again revolutionized the ability of the cylindrical grinder. Now the machine was able to receive instruction from a computer which would give it precise directions on every imaginable dimension and measurement needed to produce the desired product. This was a completely different work environment in comparison to mid-century production where a worker had to direct the machine at every point on how to manipulate the work. The third wave of change came in the 1990s with the advent of the Personal Computer. Integrating CNC and the PC into one dynamic system allowed for even further control of the manufacturing process that required little to no human supervision.

== Methods ==
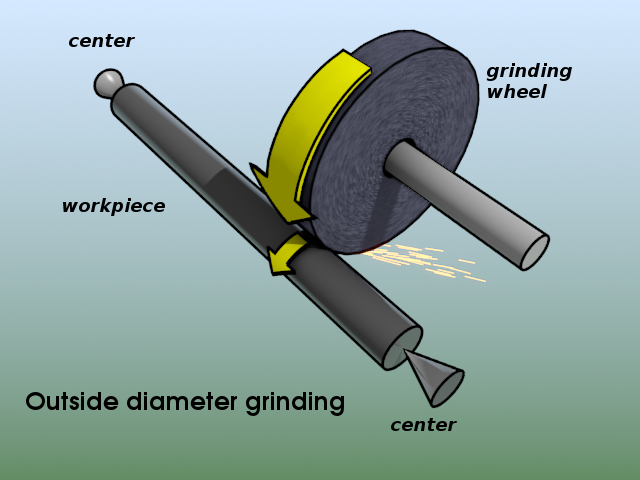
Outside Diameter Cylindrical Grinding

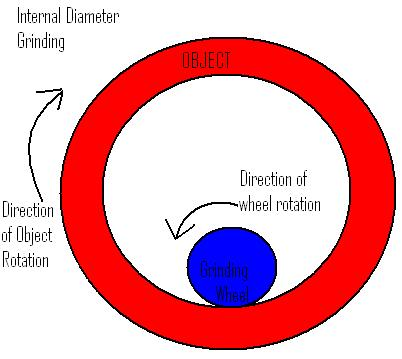
Inside Diameter Cylindrical Grinding

There are five different types of cylindrical grinding: outside diameter (OD) grinding, inside diameter (ID) grinding, plunge grinding, creep feed grinding, and centerless grinding.

=== Outside diameter grinding ===
OD grinding is grinding occurring on external surface of an object between the centers. The centers are end units with a point that allow the object to be rotated. The grinding wheel is also being rotated in the same direction when it comes in contact with the object. This effectively means the two surfaces will be moving opposite directions when contact is made which allows for a smoother operation and less chance of a jam up.

=== Inside diameter grinding ===
ID grinding is grinding occurring on the inside of an object. The grinding wheel is always smaller than the width of the hole being ground. The object is held in place by a collet, which also rotates the object in place. Just as with OD grinding, the grinding wheel and the object are rotated in opposite directions giving reversed direction contact of the two surfaces where the grinding occurs. See also ID Grinding.

=== Plunge grinding ===
A form of OD grinding, however the major difference is that the grinding wheel makes continuous contact with a single point of the object instead of traversing the object.

=== Creep feed grinding ===
Creep Feed is a form of grinding where a full depth of cut is removed in a single pass of the wheel. Successful operation of this technique can reduce manufacturing time by 50%, but often the grinding machine being used must be designed specifically for this purpose. This form occurs in both cylindrical and surface grinding.

=== Centerless grinding ===
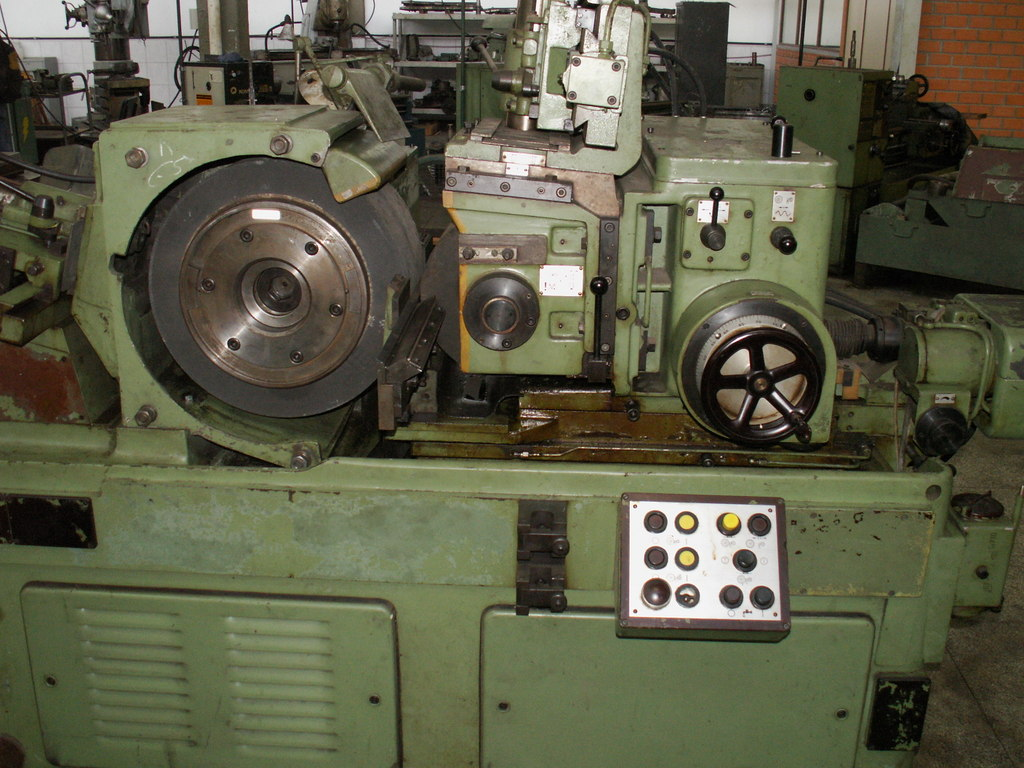
Centerless cylindrical grinder

A schematic of the centerless grinding process.

Centerless grinding is a form of grinding where there is no collet or pair of centers holding the object in place. Instead, there is a regulating wheel positioned on the opposite side of the object to the grinding wheel. A work rest keeps the object at the appropriate height but has no bearing on its rotary speed. The work blade is angled slightly towards the regulating wheel, with the workpiece centerline above the centerlines of the regulating and grinding wheel; this means that high spots do not tend to generate corresponding opposite low spots, and hence the roundness of parts can be improved. Centerless grinding is much easier to combine with automatic loading procedures than centered grinding; through feed grinding, where the regulating wheel is held at a slight angle to the part so that there is a force that is feeding the part through the grinder, is particularly efficient.

== Control methods ==
There are three basic ways in which an operator can interact with a cylindrical grinder. Either manual manipulation of the machine, Numerical Control with a punched card system or using Computer Numerical Control using a pre-existing interface designed for that machine or by using a PC as an interface to communicate with the grinder. The first two options are rarely if ever used today. CNC operated cylindrical grinders are the most technologically advanced, efficient, reliable systems in the manufacturing industry.

== See also ==
- Grinding (abrasive cutting)
