= Anca (name) =

Anca is a Romanian-language female given first name and sometimes surname. The name Anca means Gracious, Merciful, Grace, Mercy, Favour.

Notable persons with that name include:

== Persons with the given name ==
- Anca Barna (born 1977), German tennis player
- Anca Boagiu (born 1968), Romanian engineer and politician
- Anca Dragu (born 1972), Romanian economist and politician
- Anca Giurchescu (1930–2015), Romanian researcher of folk dance and founder of ethnochoreologist
- Anca Grigoraș (born 1957), Romanian artistic gymnast
- Anca Heltne (born 1978), Romanian shot putter
- Anca Mateescu (born 1981), Mexican canoeist
- Anca Măroiu (born 1983), Romanian épée fencer
- Anca Parghel (1957–2008), Romanian jazz artist
- Anca Pătrășcoiu (born 1967), Romanian swimmer
- Anca Petrescu (1949–2013), Romanian architect and politician
- Anca Pop (1984–2018), Romanian-Canadian singer-songwriter
- Anca Popescu (born 1976), Romanian volleyball player
- Anca Tănase (born 1968), Romanian rower
- Anca Todoni (born 2004), Romanian tennis player
- Anca Verma (born 1987), Romanian supermodel, former Miss Romania, and wife of arms dealer Abhishek Verma

== Persons with the surname ==
- Adrian Anca (born 1976), Romanian footballer
- Dan Anca (1947–2005), Romanian football player
- Mircea Anca (born 1960), Romanian film actor and director

== See also ==
- Ancuța, diminutive of Anca
- Bianca
