= Tool and cutter grinder =

Tool for sharpening milling cutters and tool bits

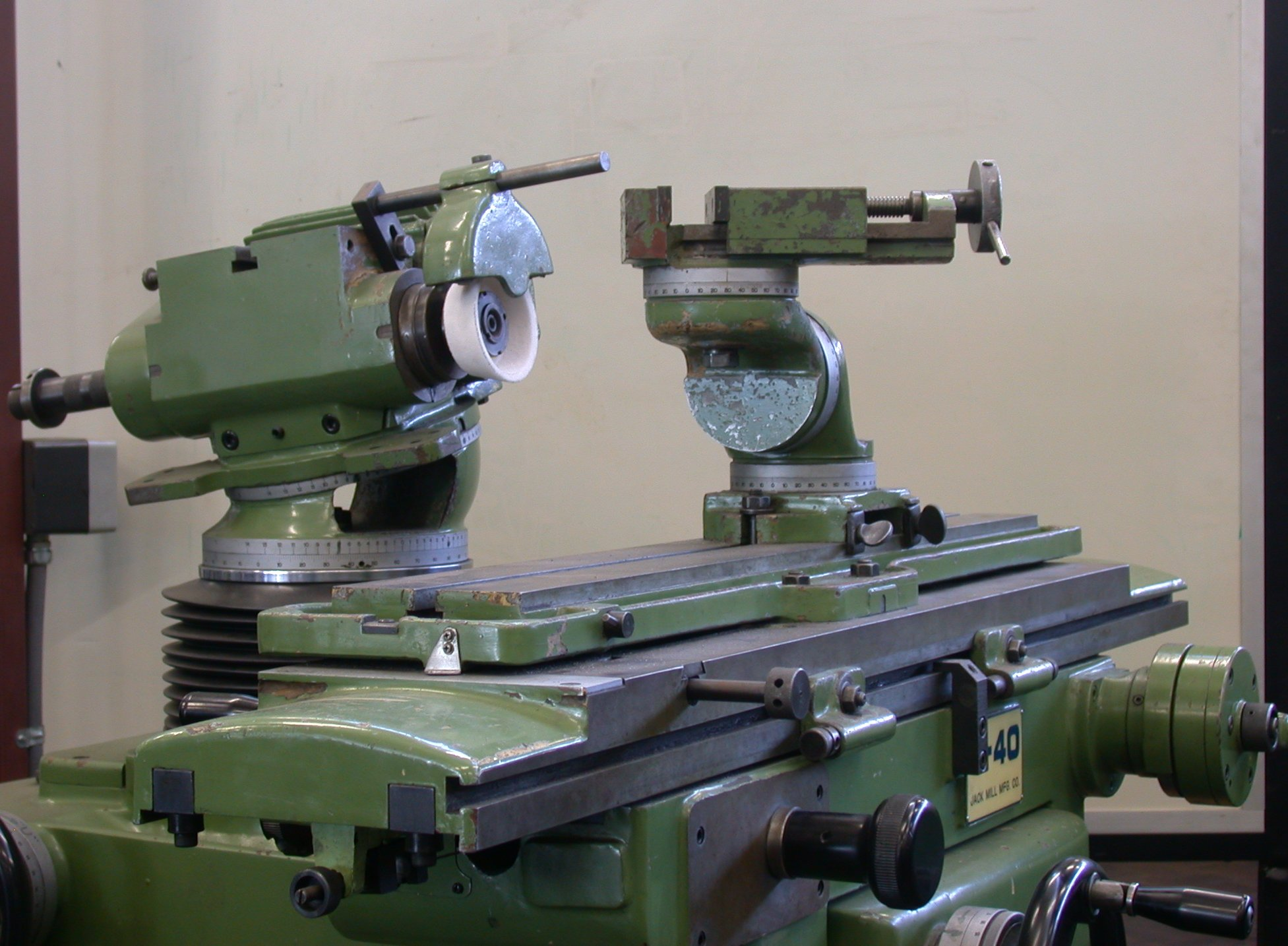
View of a typical setup on a T&C grinder

A tool and cutter grinder is used to sharpen milling cutters and tool bits along with a host of other cutting tools.

It is an extremely versatile machine used to perform a variety of grinding operations: surface, cylindrical, or complex shapes. The image shows a manually operated setup, however highly automated Computer Numerical Control (CNC) machines are becoming increasingly common due to the complexities involved in the process.

The operation of this machine (in particular, the manually operated variety) requires a high level of skill. The two main skills needed are understanding of the relationship between the grinding wheel and the metal being cut and knowledge of tool geometry. The illustrated set-up is only one of many combinations available. The huge variety in shapes and types of machining cutters requires flexibility in usage. A variety of dedicated fixtures are included that allow cylindrical grinding operations or complex angles to be ground. The vise shown can swivel in three planes.

The table moves longitudinally and laterally, the head can swivel as well as being adjustable in the horizontal plane, as visible in the first image. This flexibility in the head allows the critical clearance angles required by the various cutters to be achieved.

== CNC tool and cutter grinder ==
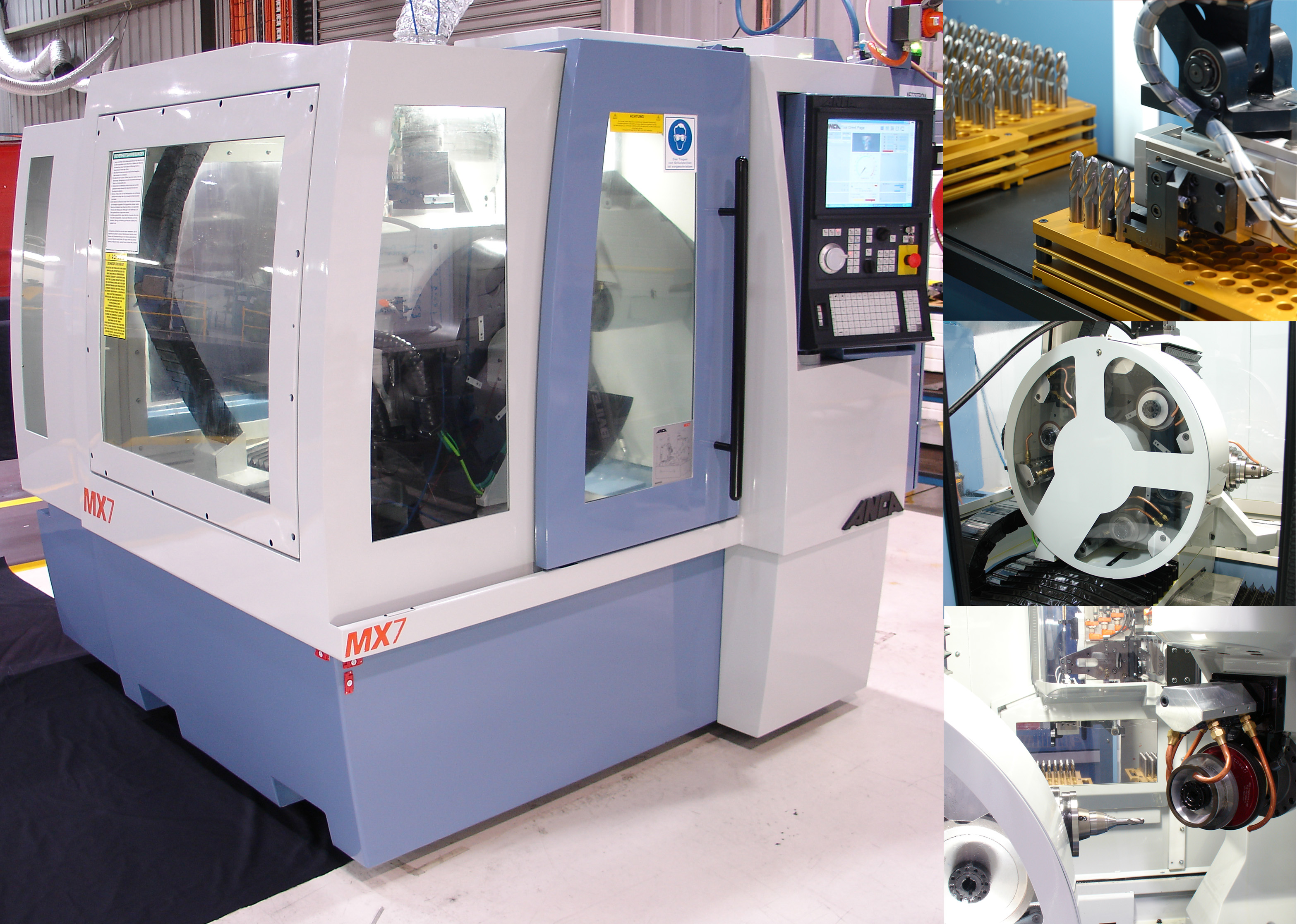
A modern CNC tool grinder with automatic wheel pack exchanger and tool loading capabilities.

Today's tool and cutter grinder is typically a CNC machine tool, usually 5 axes, which produces endmills, drills, step tools, etc. which are widely used in the metal cutting and woodworking industries.

Modern CNC tool and cutter grinders enhance productivity by typically offering features such as automatic tool loading as well as the ability to support multiple grinding wheels. High levels of automation, as well as automatic in-machine tool measurement and compensation, allow extended periods of unmanned production. With careful process configuration and appropriate tool support, tolerances less than 5 micrometres (0.0002") can be consistently achieved even on the most complex parts.

Apart from manufacturing, in-machine tool measurement using touch-probe or laser technology allows cutting tools to be reconditioned. During normal use, cutting edges either wear and/or chip. The geometric features of cutting tools can be automatically measured within the CNC tool grinder and the tool ground to return cutting surfaces to optimal condition.

Significant software advancements have allowed CNC tool and cutter grinders to be utilized in a wide range of industries. Advanced CNC grinders feature sophisticated software that allows geometrically complex parts to be designed either parametrically or by using third party CAD/CAM software. 3D simulation of the entire grinding process and the finished part is possible as well as detection of any potential mechanical collisions and calculation of production time. Such features allow parts to be designed and verified, as well as the production process optimized, entirely within the software environment.

Tool and cutter grinders can be adapted to manufacturing precision machine components. The machine, when used for these purposes more likely would be called a CNC Grinding System.

CNC Grinding Systems are widely used to produce parts for aerospace, medical, automotive, and other industries. Unlike older machines, modern grinders are able to work with indurate materials.

== Radius grinder ==
A radius grinder (or radius tool grinder) is a special grinder used for grinding the most complex tool forms, and is the historical predecessor to the CNC tool and cutter grinder. Like the CNC grinder, it may be used for other tasks where grinding spherical surfaces is necessary. The tool itself consists of three parts: The grinder head, work table, and holding fixture. The grinder head has three degrees of freedom. Vertical movement, movement into the workpiece, and tilt. These are generally set statically, and left fixed throughout operations. The work table is a T-slotted X-axis table mounted on top of a radial fixture. Mounting the X axis on top of the radius table, as opposed to the other way around, allows for complex and accurate radius grinds. The holding fixtures can be anything one can mount on a slotted table, but most commonly used is a collet or chuck fixture that indexes and has a separate Y movement to allow accurate depth setting and endmill sharpening. The dressers used on these grinders are usually quite expensive, and can dress the grinding wheel itself with a particular radius.

== D-bit grinder ==
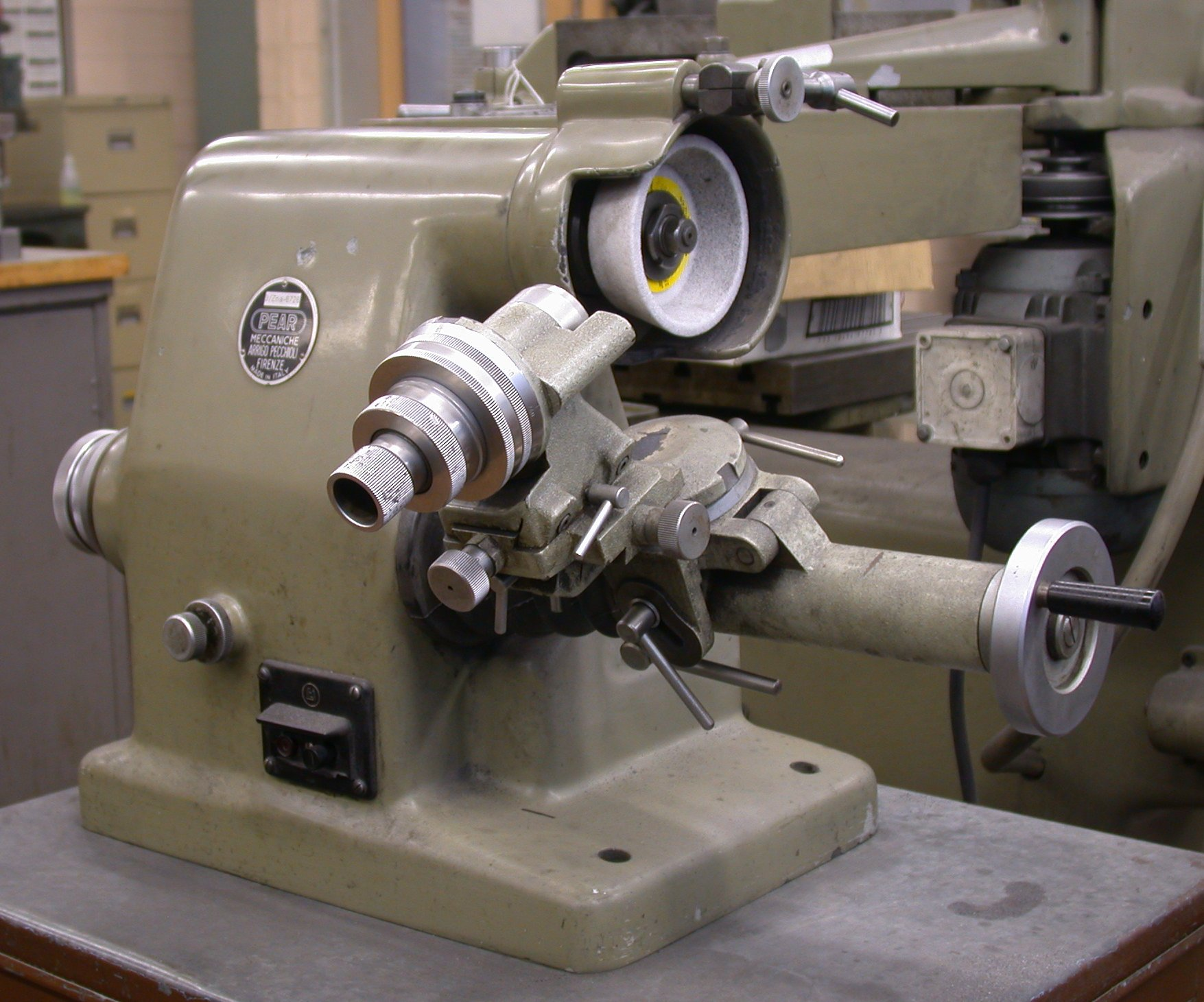
D bit grinder

The D-bit (after Friedrich Deckel, the brand of the original manufacturer) grinder is a tool bit grinder designed to produce single-lip cutters for pantograph milling machines. Pantographs are a variety of milling machine used to create cavities for the dies used in the molding process; they are largely obsolete and replaced by CNC machining centers in modern industry.

With the addition of accessory holders, the single-lip grinding capability may also be applied to grinding lathe cutting bits, and simple faceted profiles on tips of drill bits or end mills. The machine is sometimes advertised as a "universal cutter-grinder", but the "universal" term refers only to the range of compound angles available, not that the machine is capable of sharpening the universe of tools. The machine is not capable of sharpening drill bits in the standard profiles, or generating any convex or spiral profiles.
