= Cryogenic grinding =

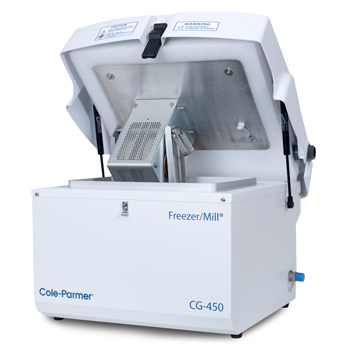
An example of a solenoid powered cryogenic grinder.

How cryogenic grinding with a solenoid works

Cryogenic grinding, also known as freezer milling, freezer grinding, and cryomilling, is the act of cooling or chilling a material and then reducing it into a small particle size. For example, thermoplastics are difficult to grind to small particle sizes at ambient temperatures because they soften, adhere in lumpy masses and clog screens. When chilled by dry ice, liquid carbon dioxide or liquid nitrogen, the thermoplastics can be finely ground to powders suitable for electrostatic spraying and other powder processes. Cryogenic grinding of plant and animal tissue is a technique used by microbiologists. Samples that require extraction of nucleic acids must be kept at −80 °C or lower during the entire extraction process. For samples that are soft or flexible at room temperature, cryogenic grinding may be the only viable technique for processing samples. A number of recent studies report on the processing and behavior of nanostructured materials via cryomilling.

== Freezer milling ==
Freezer milling is a type of cryogenic milling that uses a solenoid to mill samples. The solenoid moves the grinding media back and forth inside the vial, grinding the sample down to analytical fineness. This type of milling is especially useful in milling temperature sensitive samples, as samples are milled at liquid nitrogen temperatures. The idea behind using a solenoid is that the only "moving part" in the system is the grinding media inside the vial. The reason for this is that at liquid nitrogen temperatures (–196°C) any moving part will come under huge stress leading to potentially poor reliability. Cryogenic milling using a solenoid has been used for over 50 years and has proven to be a very reliable method of processing temperature sensitive samples in the laboratory.

== Cryomilling ==
Cryomilling is a variation of mechanical milling, in which metallic powders or other samples (e.g. temperature sensitive samples and samples with volatile components) are milled in a cryogen (usually liquid nitrogen or liquid argon) slurry or at a cryogenics temperature under processing parameters, so a nanostructured microstructure is attained. Cryomilling takes advantage of both the cryogenic temperatures and conventional mechanical milling. The extremely low milling temperature suppresses recovery and recrystallization and leads to finer grain structures and more rapid grain refinement. The embrittlement of the sample makes even elastic and soft samples grindable. Tolerances less than 5 μm can be achieved. The ground material can be analyzed by a laboratory analyzer.

== Applications in biology ==
Cryogenic grinding (or "cryogrinding") is a method of cell disruption employed by molecular life scientists to obtain broken cell material with favorable properties for protein extraction and affinity capture. Once ground, the fine powder consisting of broken cells (or "grindate") can be stored for long periods at –80°C without obvious changes to biochemical properties – making it a very convenient source material in e.g. proteomic studies including affinity capture / mass spectrometry.
