= Centerless grinding =

Machining process

A schematic diagram of the centerless grinding process

Centerless grinding is a machining process that uses abrasive cutting to remove material from a workpiece. Centerless grinding differs from centered grinding operations in that no spindle or fixture is used to locate and secure the workpiece; the workpiece is secured between two rotary grinding wheels, and the speed of their rotation relative to each other determines the rate at which material is removed from the workpiece.

Centerless grinding is typically used in preference to other grinding processes for operations where many parts must be processed in a short time.

== Working principle ==
In centerless grinding, the workpiece is held between two wheels, rotating in the same direction at different speeds, and a work-holding platform. One wheel, known as the grinding wheel (stationary wheel in the diagram), is on a fixed axis and rotates such that the force applied to the workpiece is directed downward, against the work-holding platform. This wheel usually performs the grinding action by having a higher tangential speed than the workpiece at the point of contact. The other wheel, known as the regulating wheel (moving wheel in the diagram), is movable. This wheel is positioned to apply lateral pressure to the workpiece, and usually has either a very rough or rubber-bonded abrasive to trap the workpiece.

The speed of the two wheels relative to each other provides the grinding action and determines the rate at which material is removed from the workpiece. During operation the workpiece turns with the regulating wheel, with the same linear velocity at the point of contact and (ideally) no slipping. The grinding wheel turns faster, slipping past the surface of the workpiece at the point of contact and removing chips of material as it passes.

== Types ==
There are three forms of centerless grinding, differentiated primarily by the method used to feed the workpiece through the machine.

=== Through-feed ===
In through-feed centerless grinding, the workpiece is fed through the grinding wheels completely, entering on one side and exiting on the opposite. The regulating wheel in through-feed grinding is canted away from the plane of the grinding wheel in such a way as to provide an axial force component, feeding the workpiece through between the two wheels. Through-feed grinding can be very efficient because it does not require a separate feed mechanism; however, it can only be used for parts with a simple cylindrical shape.

=== End-feed ===
In end-feed centerless grinding, the workpiece is fed axially into the machine on one side and comes to rest against an end stop; the grinding operation is performed, and then the workpiece is fed in the opposite direction to exit the machine. End-feed grinding is best for tapered workpieces.

=== In-feed ===
In-feed centerless grinding is used to grind workpieces with relatively complex shapes, such as an hourglass shape. Before the process begins, the workpiece is loaded manually into the grinding machine and the regulating wheel is moved into place. The complexity of the part shapes and grinding wheel shapes required to grind them accurately prevent the workpiece from being fed axially through the machine.

== Equipment ==
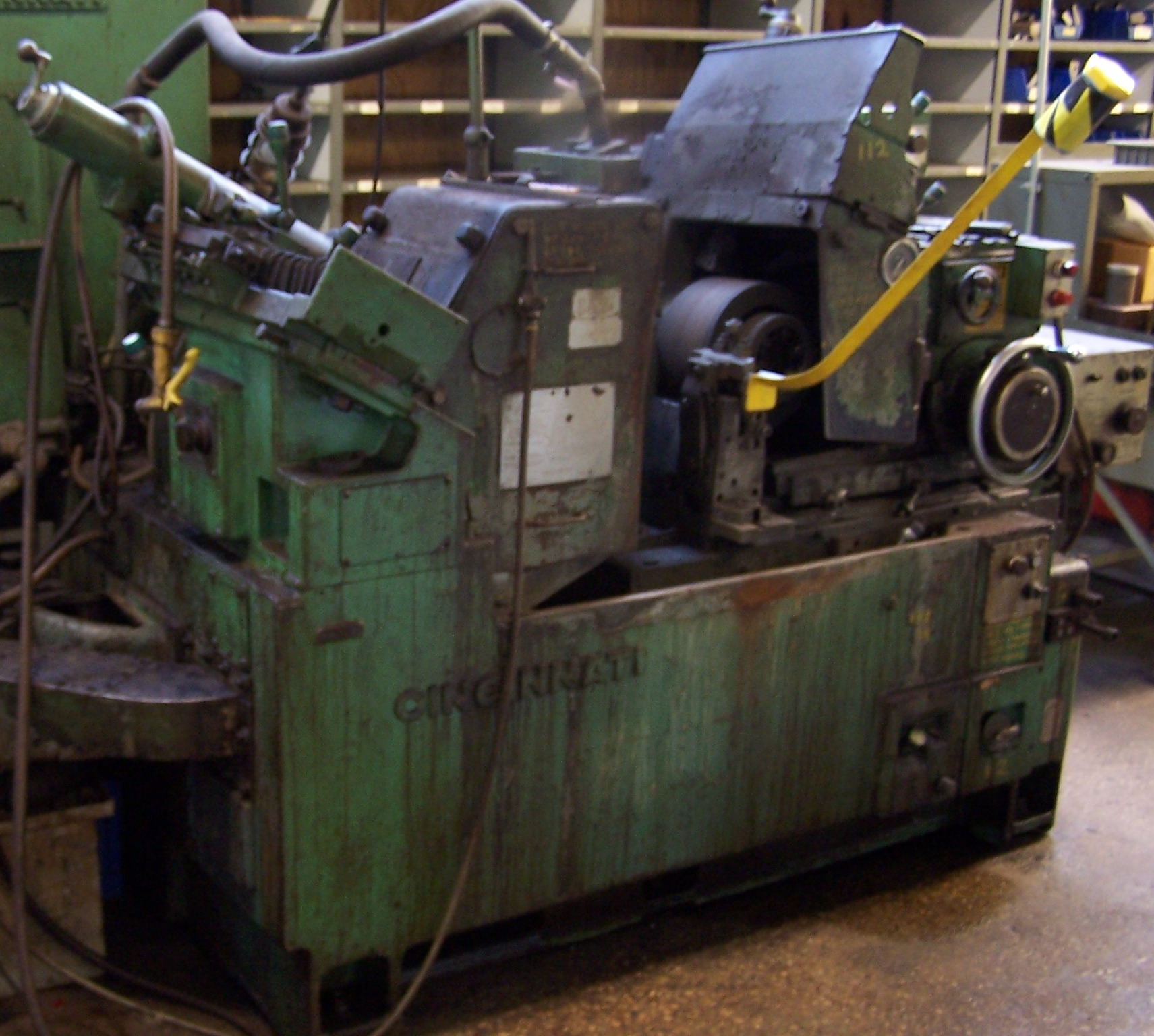
A centerless grinder

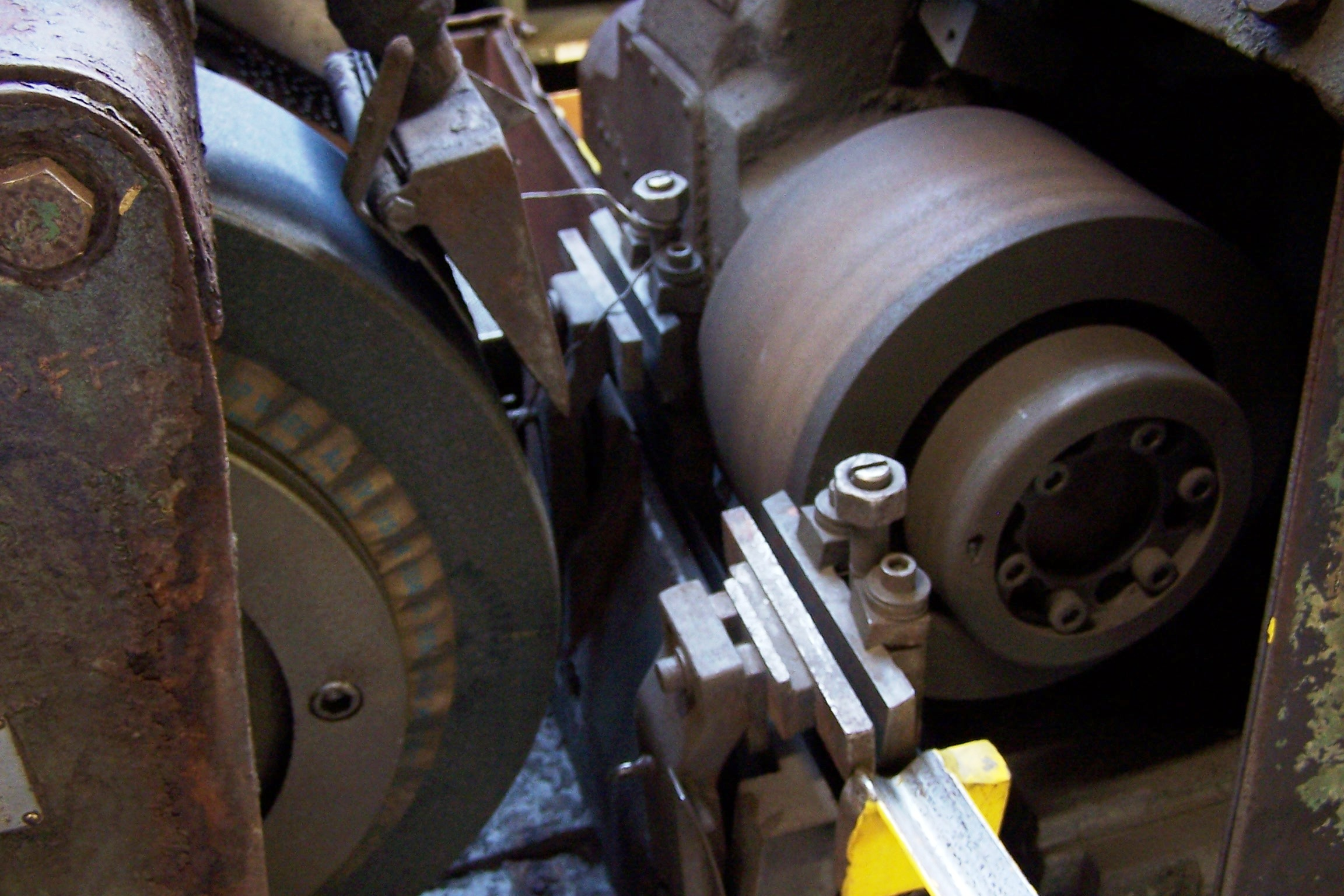
A close-up of the grinding wheel and back-up wheel

Centerless grinding uses purpose-built centerless grinding machines. Such a machine will always include the grinding wheel, regulating wheel, and some means of supporting a workpiece. Modern machines may involve computer numerical control to allow automation and improve precision. Grinding wheels are interchangeable, to allow for different grits and shapes. Machines designed to accommodate through-feed grinding operations will allow the angle of the regulating wheel to be adjusted, to accommodate parts of different sizes.

== See also ==
- Cylindrical grinder
