= Grinding (abrasive cutting) =

Machining process using a grinding wheel

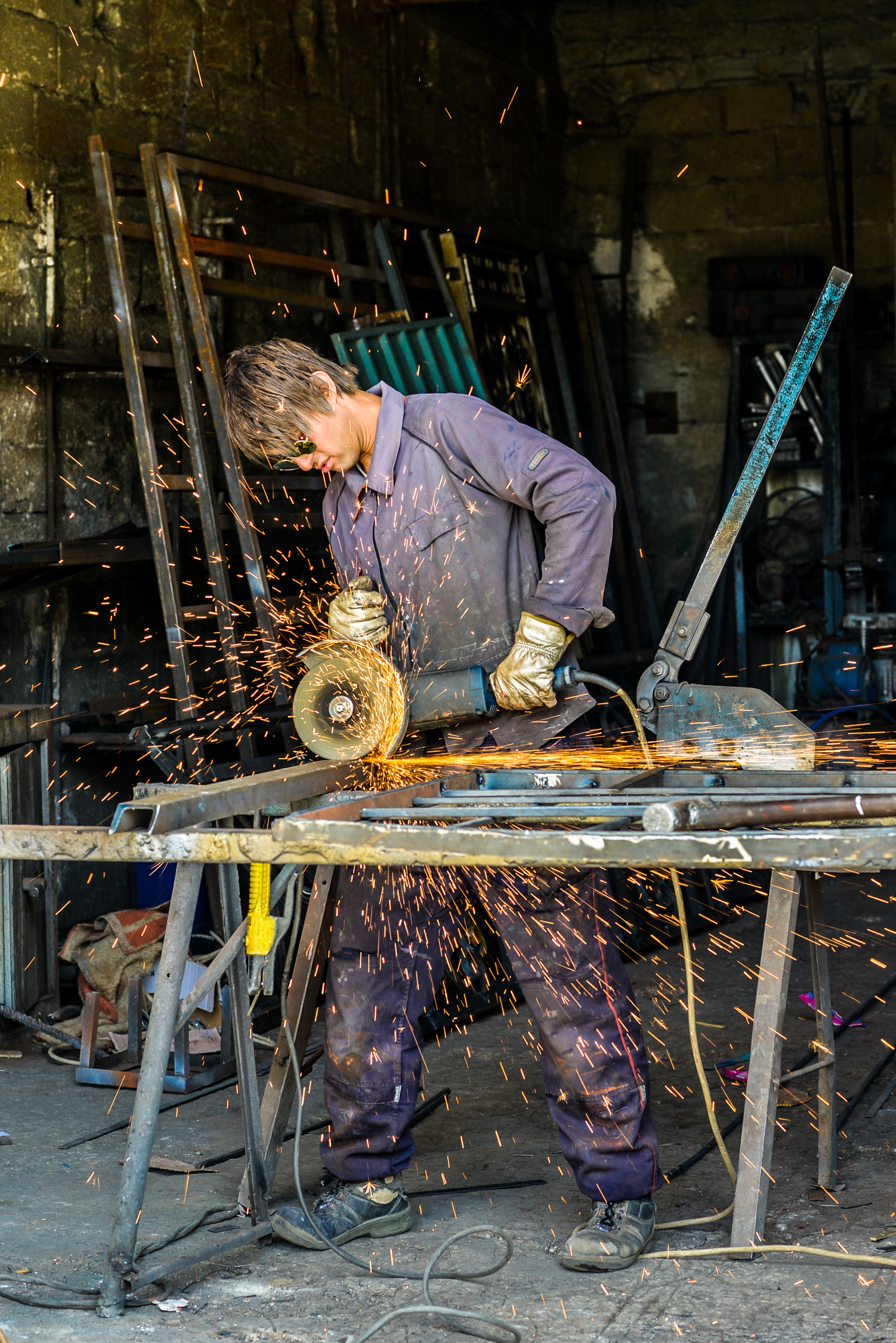
A man grinding metal using an angle grinder, causing a lot of sparks. Note the lack of protective goggles.

Grinding is a type of abrasive machining process which uses a grinding wheel as cutting tool.

A wide variety of machines are used for grinding, best classified as portable or stationary:

- Portable power tools such as angle grinders, die grinders and cut-off saws
- Stationary power tools such as bench grinders and cut-off saws
- Stationary hydro- or hand-powered sharpening stones

Milling practice is a large and diverse area of manufacturing and toolmaking. It can produce very fine finishes and very accurate dimensions; yet in mass production contexts, it can also rough out large volumes of metal quite rapidly. It is usually better suited to the machining of very hard materials than is "regular" machining (that is, cutting larger chips with cutting tools such as tool bits or milling cutters), and until recent decades it was the only practical way to machine such materials as hardened steels. Compared to "regular" machining, it is usually better suited to taking very shallow cuts, such as reducing a shaft's diameter by half a thousandth of an inch or 12.7 μm.

Grinding is a subset of cutting, as grinding is a true metal-cutting process. Each grain of abrasive functions as a microscopic single-point cutting edge (although of high negative rake angle), and shears a tiny chip that is analogous to what would conventionally be called a "cut" chip (turning, milling, drilling, tapping, etc.). However, among people who work in the machining fields, the term cutting is often understood to refer to the macroscopic cutting operations, and grinding is often mentally categorized as a "separate" process. This is why the terms are usually used separately in shop-floor practice.

Lapping and sanding are subsets of grinding.

== Processes ==
Sketch of how abrasive particles in a grinding wheel remove material from a workpiece.

The choice of grinding operation is determined by the size, shape, features and the desired production rate.

=== Creep-feed grinding ===
Creep-feed grinding (CFG) was a grinding process which was invented in Germany in the late 1950s by Edmund and Gerhard Lang. Normal grinding is used primarily to finish surfaces, but CFG is used for high rates of material removal, competing with milling and turning as a manufacturing process choice. CFG has grinding depth up to 6 mm (0.236 inches) and workpiece speed is low. Surfaces with a softer-grade resin bond are used to keep workpiece temperature low and an improved surface finish up to 1.6 μm Rmax.

CFG can take 117 s to remove 1 in^{3} (16 cm^{3}) of material. Precision grinding would take more than 200 s to do the same. CFG has the disadvantage of a wheel that is constantly degrading, requires high spindle power (51 hp or 38 kW), and is limited in the length of part it can machine.

To address the problem of wheel sharpness, continuous-dress creep-feed grinding (CDCF) was developed in the 1970s. The wheel is dressed constantly during machining in the CDCF process and keeps the wheel in a state of specified sharpness. It takes only 17 s to remove 1 in^{3} (16 cm^{3}) of material, a huge gain in productivity. 38 hp (28 kW) spindle power is required, with low-to-conventional spindle speeds. The limit on part length was erased.

High-efficiency deep grinding (HEDG) is another type of grinding. This process uses plated superabrasive wheels. These wheels never need dressing and last longer than other wheels. This reduces capital equipment investment costs. HEDG can be used on long part lengths and removes material at a rate of 1 in^{3} (16 cm^{3}) in 83 s. HEDG requires high spindle power and high spindle speeds.

Peel grinding, patented under the name of Quickpoint in 1985 by Erwin Junker Maschinenfabrik, GmbH in Nordrach, Germany, uses a thin superabrasive grinding disk oriented almost parallel to a cylindrical workpiece and operates somewhat like a lathe turning tool.

Ultra-high speed grinding (UHSG) can run at speeds higher than 40,000 fpm (200 m/s), taking 41 s to remove 1 in^{3} (16 cm^{3}) of material, but is still in the research-and-development (R&D) stage. It also requires high spindle power and high spindle speeds.

=== Cylindrical grinding ===
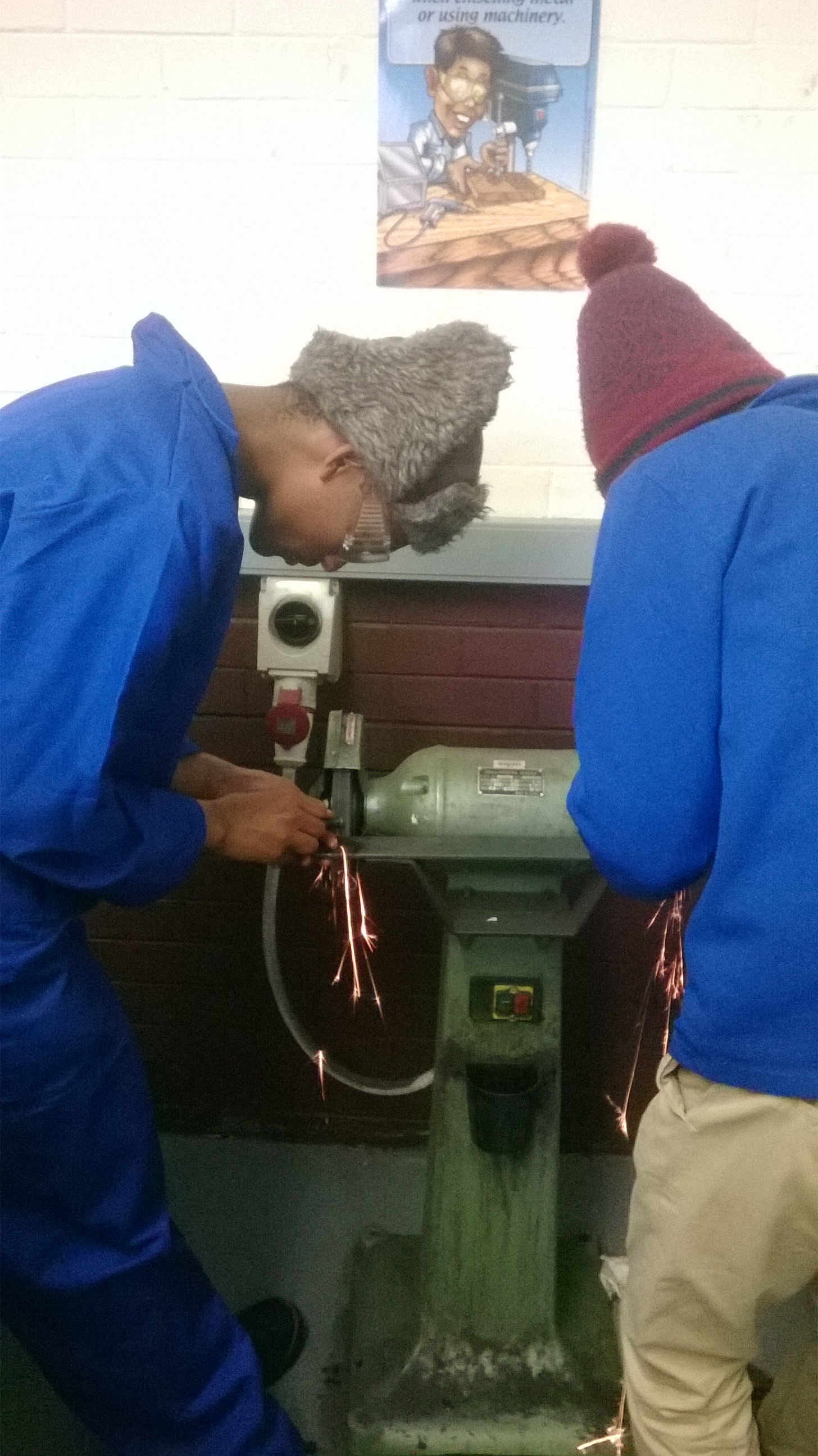
Machinists grinding workpieces on a bench grinder.

Cylindrical grinding (also called center-type grinding) is used to grind the cylindrical surfaces and shoulders of the workpiece. The workpiece is mounted on centers and rotated by a device known as a lathe dog or center driver. The abrasive wheel and the workpiece are rotated by separate motors and at different speeds. The table can be adjusted to produce tapers. The wheel head can be swiveled. The five types of cylindrical grinding are: outside diameter (OD) grinding, inside diameter (ID) grinding, plunge grinding, creep feed grinding, and centerless grinding.

A cylindrical grinder has a grinding (abrasive) wheel, two centers that hold the workpiece, and a chuck, grinding dog, or other mechanism to drive the work. Most cylindrical grinding machines include a swivel to allow the forming of tapered pieces. The wheel and workpiece move parallel to one another in both the radial and longitudinal directions. The abrasive wheel can have many shapes. Standard disk-shaped wheels can be used to create a tapered or straight workpiece geometry, while formed wheels are used to create more elaborate shapes and produces less vibration than using a regular disk-shaped wheel.

Tolerances for cylindrical grinding are held within ±0.0005 inches (13 μm) for diameter and ±0.0001 inches (2.5 μm) for roundness. Precision work can reach tolerances as high as ±0.00005 inches (1.3 μm) for diameter and ±0.00001 inches (0.25 μm) for roundness. Surface finishes can range from 2 microinches (51 nm) to 125 microinches (3.2 μm), with typical finishes ranging from 8 to 32 microinches (0.20 to 0.81 μm).

=== Surface grinding ===
Surface grinding uses a rotating abrasive wheel to remove material, creating a flat surface. The tolerances that are normally achieved with surface grinding are ±2×10^{−4} inches (5.1 μm) for grinding a flat material and ±3×10^{−4} inches (7.6 μm) for a parallel surface.

The surface grinder is composed of an abrasive wheel, a workholding device known as a chuck, either electromagnetic or vacuum, and a reciprocating table.

Grinding is commonly used on cast iron and various types of steel. These materials lend themselves to grinding because they can be held by the magnetic chuck commonly used on grinding machines and do not melt into the cutting wheel, which clogs it and prevents it from cutting. Materials that are less commonly ground are aluminum, stainless steel, brass, and plastics. These all tend to clog the cutting wheel more than steel and cast iron, but can be ground with special techniques.

=== Others ===
Centerless grinding

Centerless grinding: the workpiece is supported by a blade instead of by centers or chucks. Two wheels are used; the larger one is used to grind the surface of the workpiece, and the smaller wheel is used to regulate the axial movement of the workpiece. Types of centerless grinding include through-feed grinding, in-feed/plunge grinding, and internal centerless grinding.

Electrochemical grinding: a positively-charged workpiece in a conductive fluid is eroded by a negatively-charged grinding wheel. The pieces from the workpiece are dissolved into the conductive fluid.

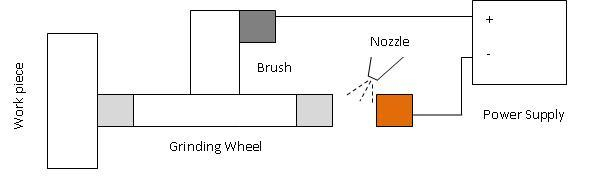
A schematic of ELID grinding

Electrolytic in-process dressing (ELID) grinding: in this ultra-precision grinding technology, the grinding wheel is dressed electrochemically and in-process to maintain the accuracy of the grinding. An ELID cell consists of a metal-bonded grinding wheel, a cathode electrode, a pulsed DC power supply, and electrolyte. The wheel is connected to the positive terminal of the DC power supply through a carbon brush, and the electrode is connected to the negative pole of the power supply. Usually, alkaline liquids are used as both electrolytes and coolant for grinding. A nozzle is used to inject the electrolyte into the gap between wheel and electrode. The gap is usually maintained to be approximately 0.1 mm to 0.3 mm. During the grinding operation one side of the wheel takes part in the grinding operation whereas the other side of the wheel is being dressed by an electrochemical reaction. The dissolution of the metallic bond material is caused by the dressing which in turns results the continuous protrusion of new sharp grits.

Form grinding is a specialized type of cylindrical grinding where the grinding wheel has the exact shape of the final product. The grinding wheel does not traverse the workpiece.

Internal grinding is used to grind the internal diameter of the workpiece. Tapered holes can be ground with the use of internal grinders that can swivel on the horizontal.

Pre-grinding: when a new tool has been built and has been heat-treated, it is pre-ground before welding or hardfacing commences. This usually involves grinding the outside diameter (OD) slightly higher than the finish grind OD to ensure the correct finish size.

== Grinding wheel ==
A grinding wheel is an expendable wheel used for various grinding and abrasive machining operations. It is generally made from a matrix of coarse abrasive particles pressed and bonded together to form a solid, circular shape; various profiles and cross-sections are available depending on the intended usage for the wheel. Grinding wheels may also be made from a solid steel or aluminium disc with particles bonded to the surface.

== Lubrication ==
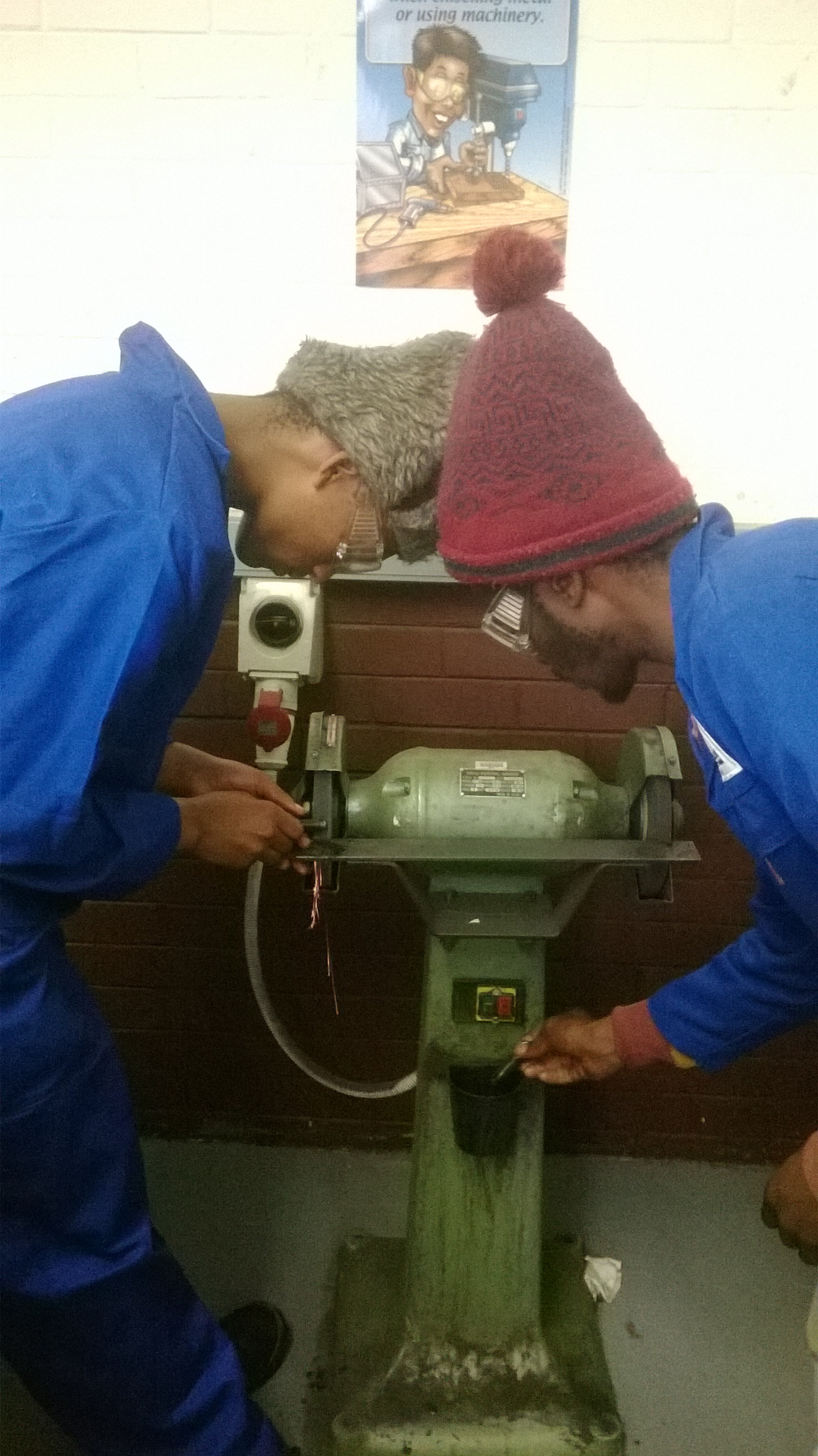
A machinist dipping workpiece in a lubricant.

The use of fluids in a grinding process is often necessary to cool and lubricate the wheel and workpiece as well as remove the chips produced in the grinding process. The most common grinding fluids are water-soluble chemical fluids, water-soluble oils, synthetic oils, and petroleum-based oils. It is imperative that the fluid be applied directly to the cutting area to prevent the fluid being blown away from the piece due to rapid rotation of the wheel.

Work Material	Cutting Fluid	Application
Aluminum	Light-duty oil or wax	Flood
Brass	Light-duty oil	Flood
Cast Iron	Heavy-duty emulsifiable oil, light-duty chemical oil, synthetic oil	Flood
Mild Steel	Heavy-duty water-soluble oil	Flood
Stainless Steel	Heavy-duty emulsifiable oil, heavy-duty chemical oil, synthetic oil	Flood
Plastics	Water-soluble oil, heavy-duty emulsifiable oil, dry, light-duty chemical oil, synthetic oil	Flood

== The workpiece ==
=== Workholding methods ===
The workpiece is manually clamped to a lathe dog, powered by the faceplate, that holds the piece in between two centers and rotates the piece. The piece and the grinding wheel rotate in opposite directions and small bits of the piece are removed as it passes along the grinding wheel. In some instances special drive centers may be used to allow the edges to be ground. The workholding method affects the production time as it changes set up times.

=== Workpiece materials ===
Typical workpiece materials include aluminum, brass, plastics, cast iron, mild steel, and stainless steel. Aluminum, brass, and plastics can have poor-to-fair machinability characteristics for cylindrical grinding. Cast Iron and mild steel have very good characteristics for cylindrical grinding. Stainless steel is very difficult to grind due to its toughness and ability to work harden, but can be worked with the right grade of grinding wheels.

=== Workpiece geometry ===
The final shape of a workpiece is the mirror image of the grinding wheel, with cylindrical wheels creating cylindrical pieces and formed wheels creating formed pieces. Typical sizes on workpieces range from 0.75 in to 20 in (18 mm to 1 m) and 0.80 in to 75 in (2 cm to 4 m) in length, although pieces from 0.25 in to 60 in (6 mm to 1.5 m) in diameter and 0.30 in to 100 in (8 mm to 2.5 m) in length can be ground. The resulting shapes can be straight cylinders, straight-edged conical shapes, or even crankshafts for engines that experience relatively low torque.

=== Effects on workpiece materials ===
Chemical property changes include an increased susceptibility to corrosion because of high surface stress.

Mechanical properties will change due to stresses put on the part during finishing. High grinding temperatures may cause a thin martensitic layer to form on the part, which will lead to reduced material strength from microcracks.

Physical property changes include the possible loss of magnetic properties on ferromagnetic materials.

== See also ==
- Cryogenic grinding
- Diamond grinding
- Diamond grinding of pavement
- Flat honing
- Grinding dresser
- High stock removal
- Honing (metalworking)
- Hydro-erosive grinding
- Modelling of particle breakage
- Scissor grinder, an old occupation
- Swarf
