= List of manufacturing processes =

Manufacturing processes

This tree lists various manufacturing processes arranged by similarity of function.

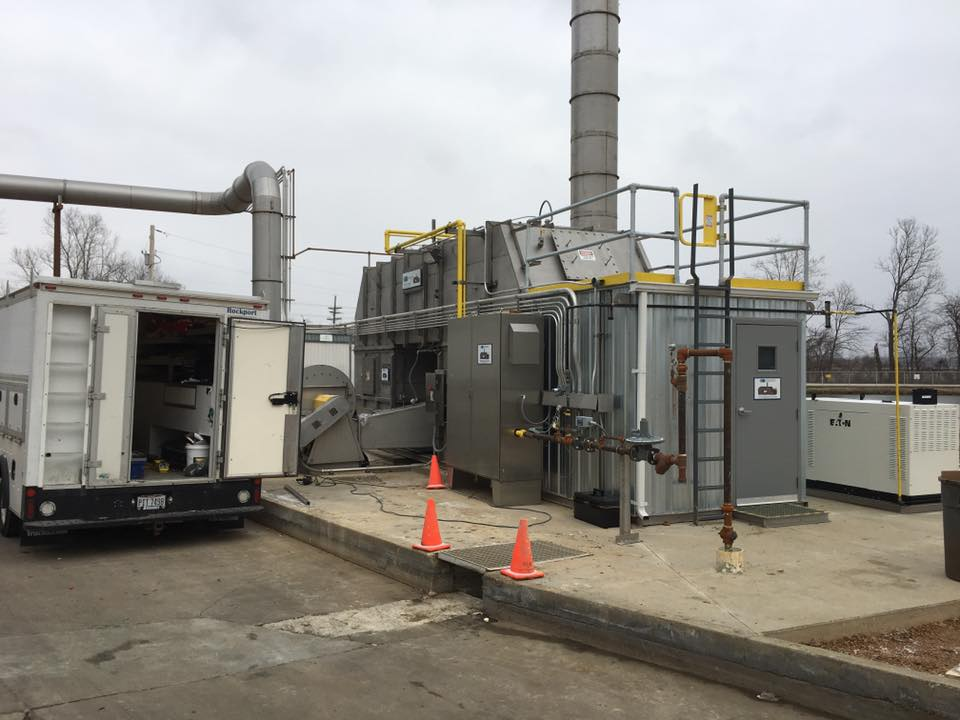
A thermal oxidizer blends several manufacturing processes such as molding, forming, machining, etc.

== Casting ==
- Bellfounding
- Centrifugal casting (industrial)
- Continuous casting
- Die casting
- Evaporative-pattern casting
  - Full-mold casting
  - Lost-foam casting
- Investment casting (Lost-wax casting)
  - Countergravity casting
  - Lost-foam casting
- Low pressure die casting
- Permanent mold casting
- Plastic mold casting
- Resin casting
- Sand casting
- Shell molding
- Slush casting, Slurry casting
- Vacuum molding

Data from Fundamentals of modern manufacturing

== Labeling and painting ==
Main articles: Imaging and Coating

- Laser engraving
- Inkjet printing
- Chemical vapor deposition
- Sputter deposition
- Plating
- Thermal spraying

== Moulding ==
- Powder metallurgy
  - Compaction plus sintering
  - Hot isostatic pressing
  - Metal injection moulding
  - Spray forming
- Plastics (see also Rapid prototyping)
  - Injection
  - Compression molding
  - Transfer
  - Extrusion
  - Blow molding
  - Dip moulding
  - Rotational molding
  - Thermoforming
  - Laminating
  - Expandable bead
  - Foam
  - Vacuum plug assist
  - Pressure plug assist
  - Matched mould
- Shrink wrapping

== Forming ==
- End tube forming
  - Tube beading
- Forging
  - Smith
  - Hammer forge
  - Drop forge
  - Press
  - Impact (see also Extrusion)
  - Upset
  - No draft
  - High-energy-rate
  - Cored
  - Incremental
  - Powder
- Rolling (Thick plate and sheet metal)
  - Cold rolling
  - Hot rolling
  - Sheet metal
  - Shape
  - Ring
  - Transverse
  - Cryorolling
  - Orbital
  - Cross-rolling
  - Thread
    - Screw thread
    - Thread rolling
- Extrusion
  - Impact extrusion
- Pressing
  - Embossing
  - Stretch forming
  - Blanking (see drawing below)
  - Drawing (manufacturing) (pulling sheet metal, wire, bar, or tube
    - Bulging
    - Necking
    - Nosing
  - Deep drawing (sinks, auto body)
- Bending
  - Hemming
- Shearing
  - Blanking and piercing
    - Trimming
    - Shaving
    - Notching
    - Perforating
    - Nibbling
    - Dinking
    - Lancing
    - Cutoff
  - Stamping
    - Metal
    - Leather
    - Progressive
  - Coining
  - Straight shearing
    - Slitting
- Other
  - Redrawing
  - Ironing
  - Flattening
  - Swaging
  - Spinning
  - Peening
  - Guerin process
  - Wheelon process
  - Magnetic pulse
  - Explosive forming
  - Electroforming
  - Staking
  - Seaming
  - Flanging
  - Straightening
  - Decambering
  - Cold sizing
  - Hubbing
  - Hot metal gas forming
  - Curling (metalworking)
  - Hydroforming

== Machining ==
- Mills
  - Grist mill
  - Hammer mill
  - Ball mill
  - Buhrstone mill
  - Disc mill
  - Saw mill
  - Steel mill
    - Blast furnace
    - Smelting
    - Refining
    - Reduction mill
    - Annealing
    - Pickling
    - Passivate
    - Coating
- Milling
- Turning
  - Lathe
  - Facing
  - Boring (also Single pass bore finishing)
  - Spinning (flow turning)
  - Knurling
  - Hard turning
  - Cutoff (parting)
- Drilling
  - Friction drilling
- Reaming
- Countersinking
- Tapping
- Sawing
  - Filing
- Broaching
- Shaping
  - Horizontal
  - Vertical
  - Special purpose
- Planing
  - Double housing
  - Open-side
  - Edge or plate
  - Pit-type
  - Abrasive jet machining
  - Water jet cutting
  - Photochemical machining
  - Abrasive belt
- Honing (Sharpening)
  - Electro-chemical grinding
- Finishing & industrial finishing
  - Abrasive blasting (sand blasting)
  - Buffing
  - Burnishing
  - Electroplating
  - Electropolishing
  - Magnetic field-assisted finishing
  - Etching
  - Linishing
  - Mass finishing
    - Tumbling (barrel finishing)
      - Spindle finishing
    - Vibratory finishing
  - Plating
  - Polishing
  - Superfinishing
  - Wire brushing
- Routing
- Hobbing
- Ultrasonic machining
- Electrical discharge
- Electrical discharge machining (EDM)
- Electron beam machining
- Electrochemical machining
- Chemical
- Photochemical
- Laser cutting
  - Laser drilling
- Grinding
  - High stock removal
- Gashing
- Biomachining
- Skiving (metalworking)

== Joining ==
- Welding
  - Arc
    - Manual metal
    - Shielded metal
    - Gas metal
      - Pulsed
      - Short circuit
      - Electrogas
      - Spray transfer
    - Gas tungsten
    - Flux-cored
    - Submerged
    - Plasma arc
    - Carbon arc
    - Stud
    - Electroslag
    - Atomic hydrogen
    - Plasma-MIG (metal inert gas)
    - Impregnated tape
    - Regulated Metal Deposition
  - Oxyfuel gas
    - Oxy-acetylene gas
    - Methylacetylene propadiene (MAPP)
    - Air-acetylene
    - Oxyhydrogen
    - Pressure gas
      - CO_{2}
  - Resistance
    - Butt welding
      - Flash butt welding
    - Shot welding
    - Spot welding
  - Projection welding
  - Seam
  - Upset welding
  - Percussion (manufacturing)
  - Solid state welding
    - Ultrasonic
    - Explosive
    - Diffusion
      - Hot press
      - Isostatic hot gas
      - Vacuum furnace
    - Friction welding
    - Inertia
    - Forge
    - Cold
    - Roll
  - Electron beam welding
  - Laser welding
  - Thermite
  - Induction
    - Low frequency (50–450 Hz)
    - High frequency (induction resistance; 200–450 kHz)
  - Others
    - Heated metal plate
    - Solvent
    - Dielectric
    - Magnetic pulse welding
    - Radio frequency welding
    - High frequency resistance
    - Electromagnetic
    - Flow
    - Resistance
    - Infrared
    - Vacuum
    - Hot-air-welding
- Brazing
  - Torch
  - Induction brazing
  - Furnace
  - Dip
- Soldering
  - Iron
  - Hot plate
  - Oven
  - Induction
  - Dip
  - Wave
  - Ultrasonic
- Sintering
- Adhesive bonding (incomplete)
  - Thermo-setting and thermoplastic
  - Epoxy
  - Modified epoxy
  - Phenolics
  - Polyurethane
  - Adhesive alloys
  - Miscellaneous other powders, liquids, solids, and tapes
- Fastening wood and metal
  - Nailing
  - Screwing
  - (By material fastened)
    - Machine (Metal)
    - Wood Screws
  - (By slot type)
    - Phillips ("Plus sign" in Canada)
    - Straight ("Minus sign" in Canada)
  - (By shape)
    - Round head
    - Flat head
    - Box head
    - Hex
    - Lag
  - Nut and bolts
  - Riveting
  - Clinching
  - Pinning
    - Cotter
    - Groove
    - Tapered
    - Roll
    - Retaining rings
    - Quick release skewer
  - Stitching
  - Stapling
- Press fitting

== Additive manufacturing ==
- 3D printing
- Direct metal laser sintering
- Filament winding, produces composite pipes, tanks, etc.
- Fused deposition modeling
- Inkjet Printing
- Laminated object manufacturing
- Laser engineered net shaping
- Layered manufacturing
- Rapid Induction Printing
- Screen printing
- Selective laser sintering
- Spark plasma sintering
- Stereolithography

== Other ==
- Mining
  - Quarrying
  - Blasting
  - Crushing
- Chemical manufacturing
- Petroleum refining
- Assembly line
- Printed circuit board manufacturing
- Semiconductor fabrication
- Packaging and labeling
- Logistics
- Woodworking
  - Joinery (see also Joining, above)
    - Lapping
    - Mortising
    - Routing (see above)
    - Biscuit joiner
- Vulcanization
- Heat treating
- Bake-out

== See also ==
- List of manufacturing occupations
- Worker–machine activity chart
