= Outline of manufacturing =

Overview of and topical guide to manufacturing

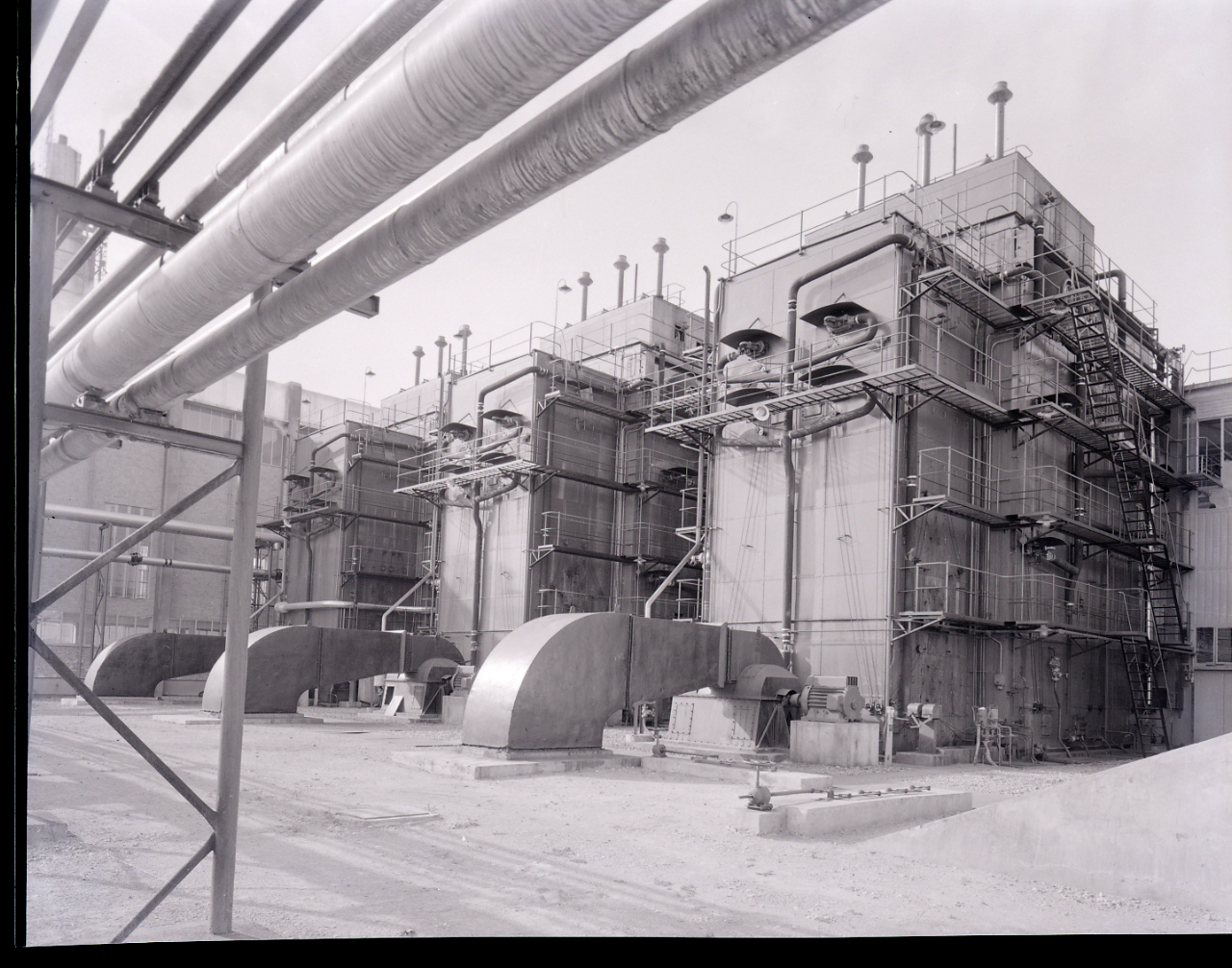
Factory in 1958, photo by Paolo Monti

The following outline is provided as an overview of and topical guide to manufacturing:

Manufacturing – use of machines, tools and labor to produce goods for use or sale. Includes a range of human activity, from handicraft to high-tech, but most commonly refers to industrial production, where raw materials are transformed into finished goods on a large scale.

== Overview ==
- Factory
- Heavy industry
- Light industry
- Mass production
- Production line

== Some manufacturing industries ==
- Aerospace industry
- Automotive industry
- Chemical industry
- Computer industry
- Electronics industry
- Food processing industry
- Garment industry
- Inflatable
- Pharmaceutical industry
- Pulp and paper industry
- Toy industry

== History ==
- Handicraft

=== Origins of manufacturing ===
Industrial Revolution

=== Emergence of the factory ===
Factory

- History of the factory
- Factory system

=== Improvement of industrial processes ===
- Industrial process
- Casting

== Theories applied to manufacturing ==
- Taylorism
- Fordism
- Scientific management

== Operations of manufacturing ==
=== Organizational control ===
- Management
  - Total Quality Management
- Quality control
  - Six Sigma

=== Manufacturing systems ===
- Craft or Guild system
- American System of manufacturing
- British factory system of manufacturing
- Soviet collectivism in manufacturing
- Mass production
- Just In Time manufacturing
- Lean manufacturing
- Flexible manufacturing
- Mass customization
- Agile manufacturing
- Rapid manufacturing
- Prefabrication
- Toyota production system
- Public and commerce industry
- Accrual basis
- Cash basis
- Merchandising inventory
- Trade discount
- Sales discount
- Memorandum
- Additive manufacturing
- Subtractive manufacturing
- Agile manufacturing
- Fabrication
- Flexible manufacturing
- Just-in-time manufacturing
- Lean manufacturing
- Manufacturing engineering
- Mass customization
- Mass production
- Numerical control
- Prefabrication
- Rapid manufacturing
- Reconfigurable manufacturing system
- High performance positioning system

=== Product design ===
- Rapid prototyping
- Computer aided design
- New product development
- Toolkits for User Innovation
- Configuration systems

=== Manufacturing engineering ===
- Production engineering
- Industrial engineering
- Computer-aided manufacturing
- Computer integrated manufacturing
- Numerically controlled
- Computer numerically controlled
- Distributed control systems
- Fieldbus control systems
- PLCs
- Packaging and labeling

=== Assembly systems ===
- Assembly line

=== Modern manufacturing processes ===
Taxonomy of manufacturing processes

Manufacturing process management

== Concepts ==
- Capital (economics)
- Capital investment
- Consumer
- Conveyor belt
- Depreciation
- Distributor
- Factory
- Fixed asset
- Industrial process
- Machine tool
- Manufacturing
  - List of manufacturing processes
- Mass production
- Plant
- Primary sector
- Process manufacturing
- Procurement
- Production line
- Raw materials
- Retailer
- Supply chain
- Warehouse
- Wholesaler

== Lists ==
- Outline of engineering
- Outline of business management
- Outline of production
- Outline of marketing
- Outline of economics
- Outline of finance
- List of international trade topics
- List of accounting topics
- List of business law topics
- List of human resource management topics
- List of business theorists
- List of economists
- List of largest manufacturing companies by revenue
- List of manufacturing occupations

== By country ==
- Manufacturing in Australia
- Manufacturing in Bangladesh
- Manufacturing in Canada
- Manufacturing in Chad
- Manufacturing in China
- Manufacturing in Ethiopia
- Manufacturing in Germany
- Manufacturing in Ghana
- Manufacturing in Hong Kong
- Manufacturing in Indonesia
- Manufacturing in Japan
- Manufacturing in Mexico
- Manufacturing in Puerto Rico
- Manufacturing in South Korea
- Manufacturing in Vietnam
- Manufacturing in the United Kingdom
- Manufacturing in the United States
- Manufacturing in India

== See also ==
- Business - for the economics and commercial management of a manufacturing company.
- Commercial law - for the law as applied to businesses.
- Industry classification - for the classification of manufacturers.
- Management and General manager - for the general management of a business.
- Political economy - for the political impact of the development of industry.
- Product lifecycle management - for the role of computer technology in manufacturing.
