= Worker–machine activity chart =

A worker–machine activity chart is a chart used to describe or plan the interactions between workers and machines over time.

As the name indicates, the chart deals with the criteria of work elements and their time for both the worker and the machine. This chart is useful to describe any repetitive worker-machine system.

== Formats ==
A typical worker-machine activity chart consists of two main columns, one for the worker and the other the machine; in some chart formats, there is a third column showing the cumulative time. The chart can also be color-coded to convey information; for example, The time column is used to specify the activity of the worker and the machine, if the column is shaded with black color, it indicates that the worker or the machine is performing an operation, while if it is shaded with gray color, it refers to inspection. For moving, it is customary to refer to it with diagonal lines, whereas horizontal lines indicate a holding activity. If the column is blank then the worker or the machine is idle. For some other uses, there is a same version to accommodate enormous worker-machine interactions, called the multiple worker-multiple machine activity chart.

== Uses ==
The chart can be used to investigate potential process improvements. It can be used to illustrate delays and redundancy, so process improvement efforts can be made to eliminate inefficiencies and identify the activities that can be combined.

== See also ==
- List of manufacturing processes
- Outline of manufacturing
