= Ultrasonic machining =

Subtractive manufacturing process

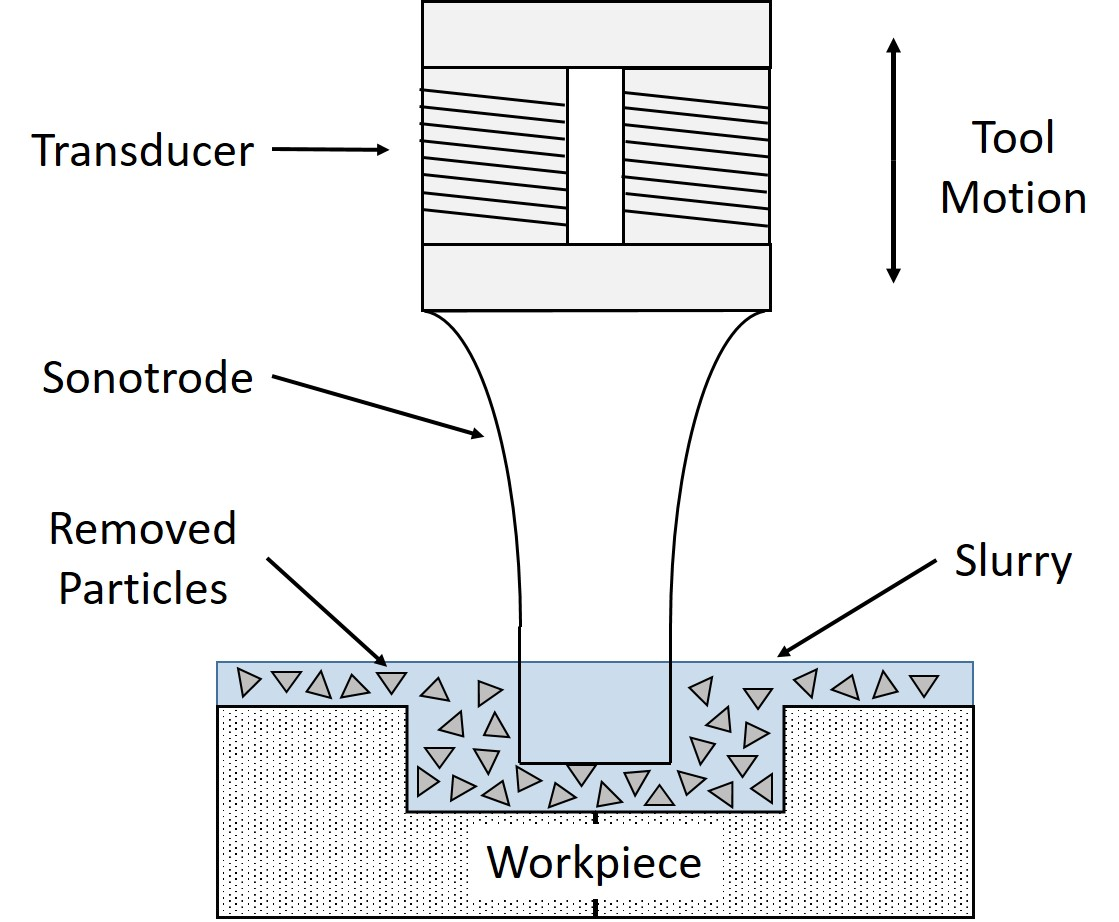
Schematic of ultrasonic machining process

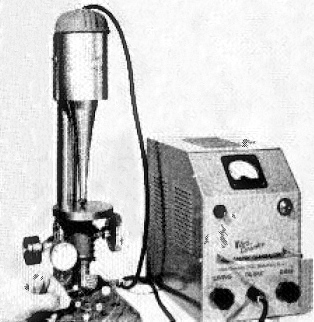
An ultrasonic drill from 1955

Ultrasonic machining is a subtractive manufacturing process that removes material from the surface of a part through high frequency, low amplitude vibrations of a tool against the material surface in the presence of fine abrasive particles. The tool travels vertically or orthogonal to the surface of the part at amplitudes of 0.05 to 0.125 mm (0.002 to 0.005 in.). The fine abrasive grains are mixed with water to form a slurry that is distributed across the part and the tip of the tool. Typical grain sizes of the abrasive material range from 100 to 1000, where smaller grains (higher grain number) produce smoother surface finishes.

Ultrasonic vibration machining is typically used on brittle materials as well as materials with a high hardness due to the microcracking mechanics.

== Process ==
An ultrasonically vibrating machine consists of two major components, an electroacoustic transducer and a sonotrode, attached to an electronic control unit with a cable. The abrasive grains in the slurry now act as a free cutting tool as they strike the workpiece thousands of times per second. An electronic oscillator in the control unit produces an alternating current oscillating at a high frequency, usually between 18 and 40 kHz in the ultrasonic range. The transducer converts the oscillating current to a mechanical vibration. Two types of transducers have been used in ultrasonic machining; either piezoelectric or magnetostrictive:

Piezoelectric transducer
This consists of a piece of piezoelectric ceramic, such as barium titanate, with two metal electrodes plated on its surface. The alternating voltage from the control unit applied to the electrodes causes the piezoelectric element to bend back and forth slightly, causing it to vibrate.
Magnetostrictive transducer
This consists of a cylinder of ferromagnetic material such as steel inside a coil of wire. Magnetostriction is an effect which causes a material to change shape slightly when a magnetic field through it changes. The alternating current from the control unit, applied to the coil, creates an alternating magnetic field in the magnetostrictive cylinder which makes it change shape slightly with each oscillation, causing it to vibrate.

The transducer vibrates the sonotrode at low amplitudes and high frequencies. The sonotrode is usually made of low carbon steel. A constant stream of abrasive slurry flows between the sonotrode and work piece. This flow of slurry allows debris to flow away from the work cutting area. The slurry usually consists of abrasive boron carbide, aluminum oxide or silicon carbide particles in a suspension of water (20 to 60% by volume). The sonotrode removes material from the work piece by abrasion where it contacts it, so the result of machining is to cut a perfect negative of the sonotrode's profile into the work piece. Ultrasonic vibration machining allows extremely complex and non-uniform shapes to be cut into the workpiece with extremely high precision.

Machining time depends on the workpiece's strength, hardness, porosity and fracture toughness; the slurry's material and particle size; and the amplitude of the sonotrode's vibration. The surface finish of materials after machining depends heavily on hardness and strength, with softer and weaker materials exhibiting smoother surface finishes. The inclusion of microcrack and microcavity features on the materials surface depend highly on the crystallographic orientation of the work piece's grains and the materials fracture toughness.

Material properties, cutting rate and roughness of various materials subjected to ultrasonic vibration machining with a 15 μm grit silica carbide slurry.
Material	Crystalline structure	Density (g/cm^{3})	Young's modulus (Gpa)	Static hardness (Gpa)	Fracture toughness, K_{Ic} (MPa·m^{1/2})	Cutting rate (μm/s)	R_{a} (μm)	R_{z} (μm)
Alumina	FCC/polycrystalline	4.0	210–380	14–20	3–5	3.8	1.5	10.9
Zirconia	Tetragonal/polycrystalline	5.8	140–210	10–12	8–10	2.3	1.7	10.7
Quartz	Trigonal/single crystal	2.65	78.3	16.0–15.0	0.54–0.52	8.4	1.5	9.6
Soda-lime glass	Amorphous	2.5	69	6.3–5.3	0.53–0.43	26.5	2.5	14.0
Ferrite	Polycrystalline	–	~180	6.8	1	28.2	1.9	11.6
LiF	FCC/single crystal	2.43	54.6	0.95–0.89	1.5	26.5	0.8	4.6

== Mechanics ==
Ultrasonic vibration machining physically operates by the mechanism of microchipping or erosion on the work piece's surface. Since the abrasive slurry is kept in motion by high frequency, low amplitude vibrations, the impact forces of the slurry are significant, causing high contact stresses. These high contact stresses are achieved by the small contact area between the slurry's particles and the work piece's surface. Brittle materials fail by cracking mechanics and these high stresses are sufficient to cause micro-scale chips to be removed from its surface. The material as a whole does not fail due to the extremely localized stress regions. The average force imparted by a particle of the slurry impacting the work piece's surface and rebounding can be characterized by the following equation:

$$F_{ave} = \frac{2mv}{t_o}$$

Where m is the mass of the particle, v is the velocity of the particle when striking the surface and t_{o} is the contact time, which can be approximated according to the following equation:

$$t_o \simeq \frac{5r}{c_o} \left( \frac{c_o}{v} \right)^\frac{1}{5}$$
$$c_o = \sqrt{\frac{E}{\rho}}$$

Where r is the radius of the particle, c_{o} is the elastic wave velocity of the work piece, E is the work pieces Young's Modulus and ρ is the materials density.

== Types ==
=== Rotary ultrasonic vibration machining ===
In rotary ultrasonic vibration machining (RUM), the vertically oscillating tool is able to revolve about the vertical center line of the tool. Instead of using an abrasive slurry to remove material, the surface of the tool is impregnated with diamonds that grind down the surface of the part. Rotary ultrasonic machines are specialized in machining advanced ceramics and alloys such as glass, quartz, structural ceramics, Ti-alloys, alumina, and silicon carbide. Rotary ultrasonic machines are used to produce deep holes with a high level of precision.

Rotary ultrasonic vibration machining is a relatively new manufacturing process that is still being extensively researched. Currently, researchers are trying to adapt this process to the micro level and to allow the machine to operate similar to a milling machine.

=== Chemical-assisted ultrasonic vibration machining ===
In chemical-assisted ultrasonic machining (CUSM), a chemically reactive abrasive fluid is used to ensure greater machining of glass and ceramic materials. Using an acidic solution, such as hydrofluoric acid, machining characteristics such as material removal rate and surface quality can be improved greatly compared to traditional ultrasonic machining. While time spent machining and surface roughness decrease with CUSM, the entrance profile diameter is slightly larger than normal due to the additional chemical reactivity of the new slurry choice. In order to limit the extent of this enlargement, the acid content of the slurry must be carefully selected as to ensure user safety and a quality product.

== Applications ==
Since ultrasonic vibration machining does not use subtractive methods that may alter the physical properties of a workpiece, such as thermal, chemical, or electrical processes, it has many useful applications for materials that are more brittle and sensitive than traditional machining metals. Materials that are commonly machined using ultrasonic methods include ceramics, carbides, glass, precious stones and hardened steels. These materials are used in optical and electrical applications where more precise machining methods are required to ensure dimensional accuracy and quality performance of hard and brittle materials. Ultrasonic machining is precise enough to be used in the creation of microelectromechanical system components such as micro-structured glass wafers.

In addition to small-scale components, ultrasonic vibration machining is used for structural components because of the required precision and surface quality provided by the method. The process can safely and effectively create shapes out of high-quality single crystal materials that are often necessary but difficult to generate during normal crystal growth. As advanced ceramics become a greater part of the structural engineering realm, ultrasonic machining will continue to provide precise and effective methods of ensuring proper physical dimensions while maintaining crystallographic properties.

=== Advantages ===
Ultrasonic vibration machining is a unique non-traditional manufacturing process because it can produce parts with high precision that are made of hard and brittle materials which are often difficult to machine. Additionally, ultrasonic machining is capable of manufacturing fragile materials such as glass and non-conductive metals that can not be machined by alternative methods such as electrical discharge machining and electrochemical machining. Ultrasonic machining is able to produce high-tolerance parts because there is no distortion of the worked material. The absence of distortion is due to no heat generation from the sonotrode against the work piece and is beneficial because the physical properties of the part will remain uniform throughout. Furthermore, no burrs are created in the process, thus fewer operations are required to produce a finished part.

=== Disadvantages ===
Because ultrasonic vibration machining is driven by microchipping or erosion mechanisms, the material removal rate of metals can be slow and the sonotrode tip can wear down quickly from the constant impact of abrasive particles on the tool. Moreover, drilling deep holes in parts can prove difficult as the abrasive slurry will not effectively reach the bottom of the hole. Note, rotary ultrasonic machining is efficient at drilling deep holes in ceramics because the absence of a slurry cutting fluid and the cutting tool is coated in harder diamond abrasives. In addition, ultrasonic vibration machining can only be used on materials with a hardness value of at least 45 HRC.
