= Operation chart =

The operation chart is a graphical and symbolic representation of the manufacturing operations used to produce a product. The operation chart illustrates only the value-adding activities in the manufacturing process; therefore, material handling and storage are not illustrated in this chart. operation chart records the overall picture of process and sequencewise steps of operations.

== Operations and their symbols in the operation chart ==
The operations described in the operation chart are:

1. Processing and assembly operations: Processing operation such as changing in shape and properties. On the other hand, joining two or more parts is an assembly operation. Furthermore, these two operations are represented by this symbols, circle (○) and (O) letter.
2. Inspection operations: Inspection operations are represented by square symbol (□) and (I) as letter. It's done by an inspector checks the material, work part and assembly for quality and quantity.

== See also ==
- Outline of manufacturing
