= Bake-out =

Process of artificially accelerating outgassing

Bake-out, in several areas of technology and fabrication, and in building construction, refers to the process of using high heat temperature (heat), and possibly vacuum, to remove volatile compounds from materials and objects before placing them into situations where the slow release of the same volatile compounds would contaminate the contents of a container or vessel, spoil a vacuum, or cause discomfort (odor or irritation) or illness. Bake-out is an artificial acceleration of the process of outgassing.

== In manufacturing ==
In various physics and vacuum device engineering, such as particle accelerators, semiconductor fabrication, and vacuum tubes, bake-out is a manufacturing process, the period of time when a part or device is placed in a vacuum chamber (or its operating vacuum state, for devices which operate in vacuum) and heated, usually by built-in heaters. This drives off gases, which are removed by continued operation of the vacuum pump. Low hydrogen annealing, or hydrogen "baking", is used to help reduce or remove hydrogen in stainless bulk steel.

== In construction ==
In building construction, bake-out is the use of heat to remove volatile organic compounds such as solvents remaining in paint, carpets, and other building materials from a building after its construction, to reduce annoying odors or improve indoor air quality. The building interior is heated to a much higher temperature than normal and kept at that temperature for an extended period of time, to encourage such compounds to vaporize into the air, which is vented (released to the atmosphere).

== See also ==
- Vacuum
- Indoor air quality
- Volatile organic compounds
