= Abrasive jet machining =

Abrasive jet machining (AJM), also known as abrasive micro-blasting, pencil blasting and micro-abrasive blasting, is an abrasive blasting machining process that uses abrasives propelled by a high velocity gas to erode material from the workpiece. Common uses include cutting heat-sensitive, brittle, thin, or hard materials. Specifically it is used to cut intricate shapes or form specific edge shapes.

== Process ==
Material is removed by fine abrasive particles, usually about 0.001 in (0.025 mm) in diameter, driven by a high velocity fluid stream; common gases are air or inert gases. Pressures for the gas range from 25 to 130 psig (170–900 kPa or 4 bars) and speeds can be as high as 300 m/s (1,000 km/h).

=== Equipment ===
AJM machines are usually self-contained bench-top units. First it compresses the gas and then mixes it with the abrasive in a mixing chamber. The gas passes through a convergent-divergent nozzle before entering the mixing chamber, and then exits through a convergent nozzle. The nozzle can be hand held or mounted in a fixture for automatic operations.

Nozzles must be highly resistant to abrasion and are typically made of tungsten carbide or synthetic sapphire. For average material removal, tungsten carbide nozzles have a useful life of 12 to 30 hours, and sapphire nozzles last about 400 hours. The distance of the nozzle from the workpiece affects the size of the machined area and the rate of material removal.

Grit size and orifice diameters for various abrasive materials
Abrasive material	Grit size (μin)	Orifice diameter (in)
Aluminum oxide	10–50	0.005–0.018
Silicon carbide	25–50	0.008–0.018
Glass beads	2500	0.026–0.05

== Advantages and disadvantages ==
The main advantages are its flexibility, low heat production, and ability to machine hard and brittle materials. Its flexibility owes from its ability to use hoses to transport the gas and abrasive to any part of the workpiece. Normally inaccessible portion can be machined with good accuracy.

One of the main disadvantages is its slow material removal rate; for this reason it is usually used as a finishing process. Another disadvantage is that the process produces a tapered cut.
