= Electrochemical grinding =

Electrochemical grinding is a process that removes electrically conductive material by grinding with a negatively charged abrasive grinding wheel, an electrolyte fluid, and a positively charged workpiece. Materials removed from the workpiece stay in the electrolyte fluid. Electrochemical grinding is similar to electrochemical machining but uses a wheel instead of a tool shaped like the contour of the workpiece.

== Process characteristics ==
- The wheels and workpiece are electrically conductive.
- Wheels used last for many grindings - typically 90% of the metal is removed by electrolysis and 10% from the abrasive grinding wheel.
- Capable of producing smooth edges without the burrs caused by mechanical grinding.
- Does not produce appreciable heat that would distort workpiece.
- Decomposes the workpiece and deposits them into the electrolyte solution. The most common electrolytes are sodium chloride and sodium nitrate at concentrations of 2 lbs per gallon (20%).

== Process ==
The electrochemical grinding process combines traditional electrochemical machining and grinding processes to remove material from a workpiece. A grinding wheel is used as a cutting tool as a cathode and the workpiece is an anode. During the process, electrolytic fluid, typically sodium nitrate, is pumped into the space between the workpiece and the grinding wheel. Other electrolytes used include sodium hydroxide, sodium carbonate, and sodium chloride. This electrolytic fluid will cause electrochemical reactions to occur at the workpiece surface which oxidize the surface, thereby removing material. As a consequence of the oxidation which occurs, layers of oxide films will form on the workpiece surface, and these need to be removed by the grinding wheel. A couple schematics of the process are provided below.

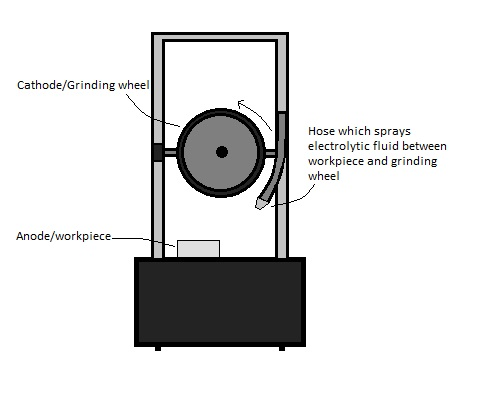
Schematic of electrochemical grinding

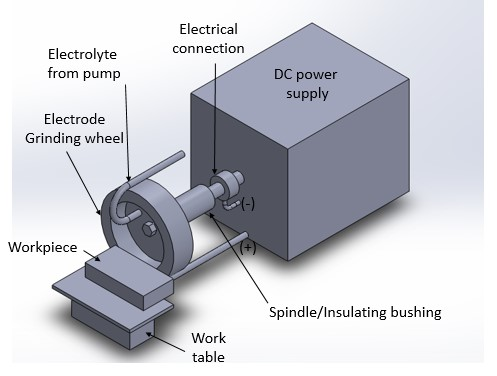
Electrochemical Grinding Schematic

Abrasive materials, either diamond or aluminum oxide, are bonded to the grinding wheel, which allows the wheel to remove the oxide layers on the workpiece surface by abrasive action. Appropriate materials used for electrolyte fluid and the grinding wheel abrasives are summarized in the table below.

Component	Material
Grinding Wheel Abrasives	Diamond, Aluminum Oxide
Electrolytic Fluid	Sodium Nitrate, Sodium Hydroxide, Sodium Carbonate, Sodium Chlorate

Most material removal is by the electrochemical reactions which occur at the workpiece surface. Five percent or less of the material removal is carried out by the abrasive action of the grinding wheel. The fact that most material is not removed by abrasive action helps increase the life of the grinding wheel; that is, the tool will take a long time to wear down. The electrolytic fluid serves another useful purpose - it flushes out leftover material in between the grinding wheel and workpiece. The abrasive particles bonded to the grinding wheel will help to electrically insulate the space between the grinding wheel and workpiece. An equation giving the material removal rate for an electrochemical grinding process is provided in and is stated here as:

MRR = GI/ρF

where ρ is the workpiece density, G is the total mass of the workpiece, I is the current supplied, MRR is the material removal rate, and F is Faraday's constant.

Some of the main factors which govern the performance of an electrochemical grinding process include current supplied, rotation speed of the grinding wheel, the workpiece feed rate, the type of electrolyte used, electrolyte feed rate, and the workpiece's chemical properties. By changing these parameters, one can alter the material removal rate. Increasing the supplied current, rotation speed of the wheel, electrolyte feed rate, or the workpiece feed rate will lead to an increase in material removal rate (MRR), while decreasing these properties will do the opposite. If the workpiece is more reactive to the electrolyte used, then the material removal rate will increase. The grinding wheel is usually rotated with a surface speed of 1200–2000 m/min and supplied currents are around 1000A.

The accuracy of parts made by electrochemical grinding is strongly dictated by the chemical properties of the workpiece and electrolytic fluid used. If the workpiece is very reactive to the electrolyte, and if too much electrolyte is pumped into the space between the grinding wheel and workpiece, it may be difficult to control the material removal, which can lead to loss of accuracy. Also, accuracy may be reduced if the workpiece feed rate is too high.

The wheels are metal disks with abrasive particles embedded. Copper, brass, and nickel are the most commonly used materials; aluminum oxide is typically used as an abrasive when grinding steel. A thin layer of diamond particles will be used when grinding carbides or steels harder than 65 Rc.

An electrolytic spindle with carbon brushes, acting as a commutator, holds the wheel. The spindle receives a negative charge from the DC power supply, which gives the workpiece a positive charge. The electrolytic fluid is applied where the work contacts the tool by a nozzle similar to that which supplies coolant in conventional grinding. The fluid works with the wheel to form electrochemical cells that oxidize the surface of the workpiece. As the wheel carries away the oxide, fresh metal is exposed. Removing the oxidized fluid may only require a pressure of 20 psi or less, causing much less distortion than mechanical grinding. The wheel is subject to little wear, reducing the need for truing and dressing.

== Tolerance ==
- This kind of grinding is mostly used because it can shape very hard metals and also because it is a chemical reducing process, the wheel lasts a longer time than normal grinding wheel can.
- This type of grinding has different types of wheels, so it can shape metals to whatever they need to be shaped to.
- Produces a smoother, burr-free surface and causes less surface stress than other grinding methods.

== Applications ==
Electrochemical grinding is often used for hard materials where conventional machining is difficult and time-consuming, such as stainless steel and some exotic metals. For materials with hardness greater than 65 HRC, ECG can have a material removal rate 10 times that of conventional machining. Because ECG involves little abrasion, it is often used for processes where the surface of the part is needs to be free of burrs, scratches, and residual stresses. Because of these properties, electrochemical grinding has a number of useful applications.

- Grinding turbine blades
- Grinding honeycomb metals for aerospace application
- Sharpening hypodermic needles
- Machining carbide cutting-tool inserts
- ECG is used to remove surface defects from parts where excessive material removal and residual stresses are undesired, such as re-profiling locomotive gears
- Removal of fatigue cracks from underwater steel structures. In this case, seawater itself acts as the electrolyte. Diamond particles in the grinding wheel remove any non-conducting organic matter, such as algae, before electrochemical grinding begins.

== Advantages and disadvantages ==
One of the key advantages of electrochemical grinding is the minimal wear that the grinding wheel tool experiences. This is because the majority of the material is removed by the electrochemical reaction that occurs between the cathode and anode. The only time that abrasive grinding actually occurs is in removing the film that develops on the surface of the workpiece. Another advantage of electrochemical grinding is that it can be used to machine hard materials. Hard materials pose a difficulty to other types of machining due to the tool wear that is associated with machining hard materials. It may come as a bit of a surprise that electrochemical grinding can remove material from a hard surface and experience minimal wear. Because most material is removed through electrochemical reactions, the workpiece does not experience heat damage like it would in a conventional grinding process.

Electrochemical grinding also has a few disadvantages as well. The system consists of the anode workpiece and the cathode grinding wheel. In order to create those conditions both the workpiece and the grinding wheel must be conductive. This limits the types of workpiece materials that are suitable for electrochemical grinding. Another disadvantage of electrochemical grinding is that it is only applicable to surface grinding. It is not possible to apply electrochemical grinding to workpieces that have cavities, due to the grinding wheels inability to remove the film deposit with in the cavity. One other disadvantage is the electrolytic fluid can cause corrosion at the workpiece and grinding wheel surfaces. Lastly, electrochemical grinding is more complicated than traditional machining methods. This will require more experienced personnel to operate the machinery, which will lead to higher production cost. Another disadvantage is that chemical used during grinding process need to be properly disposed of depending on the environmental regulation.
