= Biomachining =

Using bacteria to remove materials

Biomachining is the machining process of using lithotropic bacteria to remove material from metal parts, contrasted with chemical machining methods such as chemical milling and physical machining methods such as milling. Certain bacteria, such as Thiobacillus ferrooxidans and Thiobacillus thiooxidans, which are also used in the mineral refinement process of bioleaching, utilize the chemical energy from oxidation of iron or copper to fix carbon dioxide from the air. A metal object, when placed in a culture fluid containing these metal-metabolizing bacteria, will have material removed from its surface over time.

Biomachining is ideal for micromachining due to its very low material removal rate. In addition, biomachining is less likely to leave an undesirable surface finish; neither chemical nor physical energy is concentrated on the cutting area, so the possibility of a damaged or burned surface is slim.

This process has been successfully used to cut both pure iron and pure copper.

== Process ==
Biomachining is performed in a manner similar to chemical milling: the area to be cut is marked out as a negative image with an inert maskant, used to protect the areas that are not to be cut. The part is then dipped into a bath of culture fluid, which is kept at a precise temperature and stirred throughout the process. Laboratory experiments on the subject have determined that the depth of any cuts produced increases as the stirring rate increases; this depth is also affected by the temperature of the process.

== Sources ==
- Yoshiyuki, Uno; Toshiaki, Kaneeda; Yokomizo, Seiichi (15 December 1996). "Fundamental Study on Biomachining : Machining of Metals by Thiobacillus ferrooxidans". JSME International Journal. Ser. C, Dynamics, control, robotics, design and manufacturing. 39 (4).
