= Electron-beam welding =

Use of accelerated electrons to join metal parts via melting

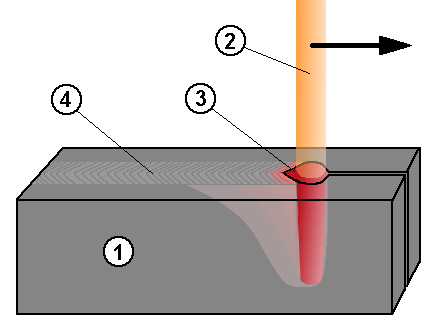
Illustration of keyhole electron beam welding: 1) object, 2) electron beam, 3) keyhole, 4) weld.

Electron-beam welding (EBW) is a fusion welding process in which a beam of high-velocity electrons is applied to two materials to be joined. The workpieces melt and flow together as the kinetic energy of the electrons is transformed into heat upon impact. EBW is often performed under vacuum conditions to prevent dissipation of the electron beam.

== History ==
Electron-beam welding was developed by the German physicist Karl-Heinz Steigerwald in 1949, who was at the time working on various electron-beam applications. Steigerwald conceived and developed the first practical electron-beam welding machine, which began operation in 1958. American inventor James T. Russell was also credited with designing and building the first electron-beam welder.

In 2023–2025, driven by small modular reactor (SMR) development, robotic EBW techniques enabled the welding of pressure vessels in hours to days instead of months. In 2024, a 3 m-diameter (200 mm thickness) SMR pressure vessel demonstrator was completed in under 24 hours using a single-pass, full-penetration welding robot.

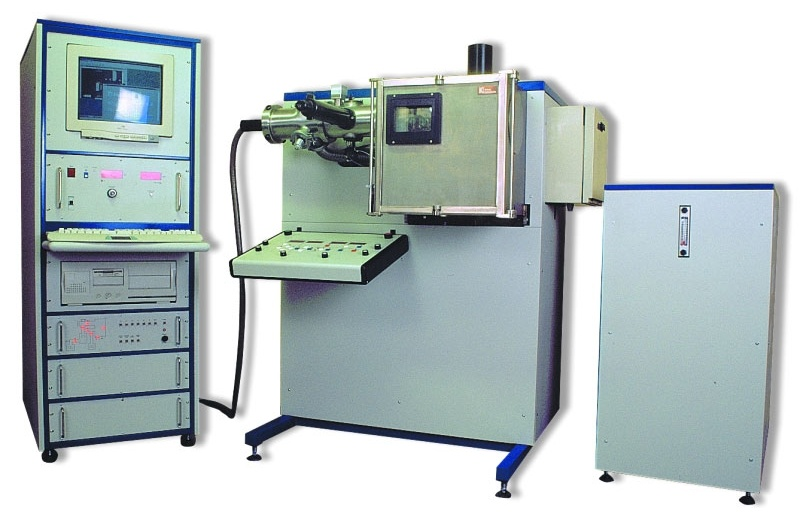
Electron-beam welder

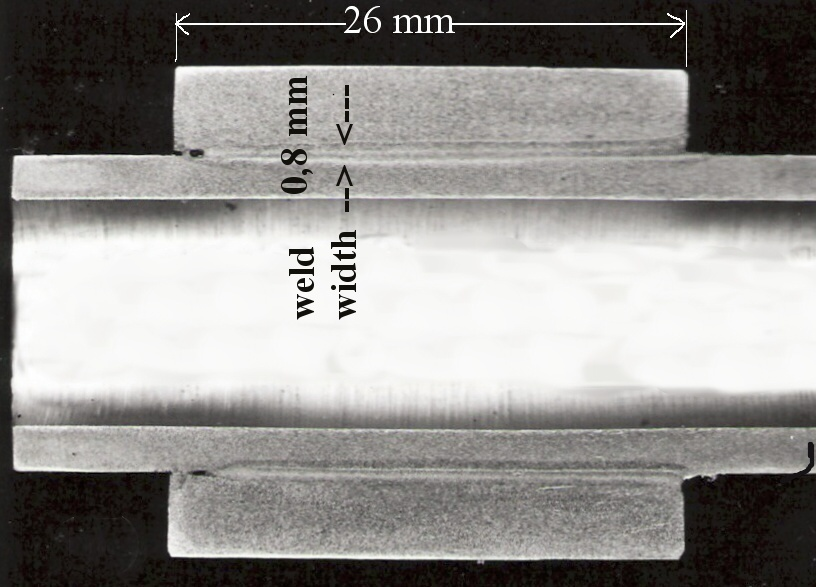
Deep narrow weld

== Physics ==
Electrons are elementary particles possessing a mass m = 9.1 · 10^{−31} kg and a negative electrical charge e = 1.6 · 10^{−19} C. They exist either bound to an atomic nucleus, as conduction electrons in the atomic lattice of metals, or as free electrons in vacuum.

Free electrons in vacuum can be accelerated, with their paths controlled by electric and magnetic fields. In this way beams of electrons carrying high kinetic energy can be formed. Upon collision with atoms in solids their kinetic energy transforms into heat. EBW provides excellent welding conditions because it involves:

- Strong electric fields, which can accelerate electrons to high speed that carry high power, equal to the product of beam current and accelerating voltage. By increasing the beam current and the accelerating voltage, the beam power can be increased to practically any desired value.
- Magnetic lenses can shape the beam into a narrow cone and focus to a small diameter. This allows for a high power density on the surface to be welded. Values of power density in the crossover (focus) of the beam can be as high as 10^{4}–10^{6} W/mm^{2}.
- Penetration depths can be on the order of hundredths of a millimeter. This provides a high volumetric power density, which can reach values of the order 10^{5}–10^{7} W/mm^{3}. The temperature in this volume can increase rapidly, up to 10^{8}–10^{10} K/s.

Beam effectiveness depends on many factors. The most important are the physical properties of the materials to be welded, especially the ease with which they can be melted or vaporize under low-pressure conditions. EBW can be so intense that material can boil way, which must be taken into account. At lower values of surface power density (in the range of about 10^{3} W/mm^{2}) the loss of material by evaporation is negligible for most metals, which is favorable for welding. At higher power, the material affected by the beam can quickly evaporate; switching from welding to machining.

=== Beam formation ===
==== Cathode ====
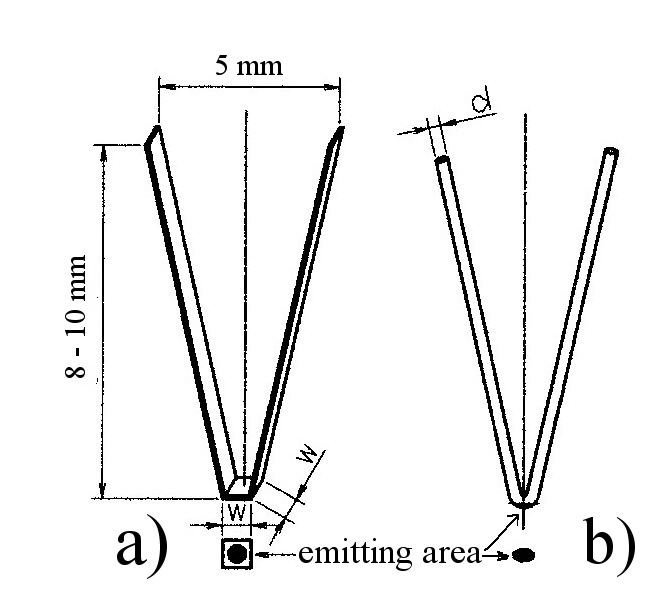
Tungsten Filament Cathodes: a) Ribbon b) Hairpin

Conduction electrons (those not bound to the nucleus of atoms) move in a crystal lattice of metals with velocities distributed according to Gauss's law and depending on temperature. They cannot leave the metal unless their kinetic energy (in eV) is higher than the potential barrier at the metal surface. The number of electrons fulfilling this condition increases exponentially with increasing metal temperature, following Richardson's rule.

As a source of electrons for electron-beam welders, the material must fulfill certain requirements:

- To achieve high power density, the emission current density [A/mm^{2}], hence the working temperature, should be as high as possible,
- To keep evaporation in vacuum low, the material must have a low enough vapour pressure at the working temperature.
- The emitter must be mechanically stable, not chemically sensitive to gases present in the vacuum atmosphere (like oxygen and water vapour), easily available, etc.

These and other conditions limit the choice of material for the emitter to metals with high melting points, practically to only tantalum and tungsten. Tungsten cathodes allow emission current densities about 100 mA/mm^{2}, but only a small portion of the emitted electrons takes part in beam formation, depending on the electric field produced by the anode and control electrode voltages. The most frequently used cathode is made of a tungsten strip, about 0.05 mm thick, shaped as shown in Figure 1a. The appropriate width of the strip depends on the highest required value of emission current. For the lower range of beam power, up to about 2 kW, the width w=0.5 mm is appropriate.

==== Acceleration ====
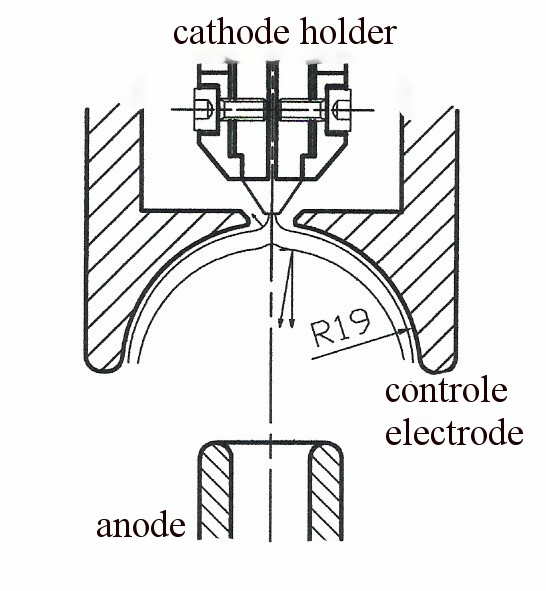
Beam generator

Electrons emitted from the cathode are low energy, only a few eV. To give them the required speed, they are accelerated by an electric field applied between the emitter and the anode. The accelerating field must also direct the electrons to form a narrow converging “bundle” around an axis. This can be achieved by an electric field in the proximity of the cathode which has a radial addition and an axial component, forcing the electrons in the direction of the axis. Due to this effect, the electron beam converges to some diameter in a plane close to the anode.

For practical applications the power of the electron beam must be controllable. This can be accomplished by another electric field produced by another cathode negatively charged with respect to the first.

At least this part of electron gun must be evacuated to high vacuum, to prevent "burning" the cathode and the emergence of electrical discharges.

==== Focusing ====
After leaving the anode, the divergent electron beam does not have a power density sufficient for welding metals and has to be focused. This can be accomplished by a magnetic field produced by electric current in a cylindrical coil.

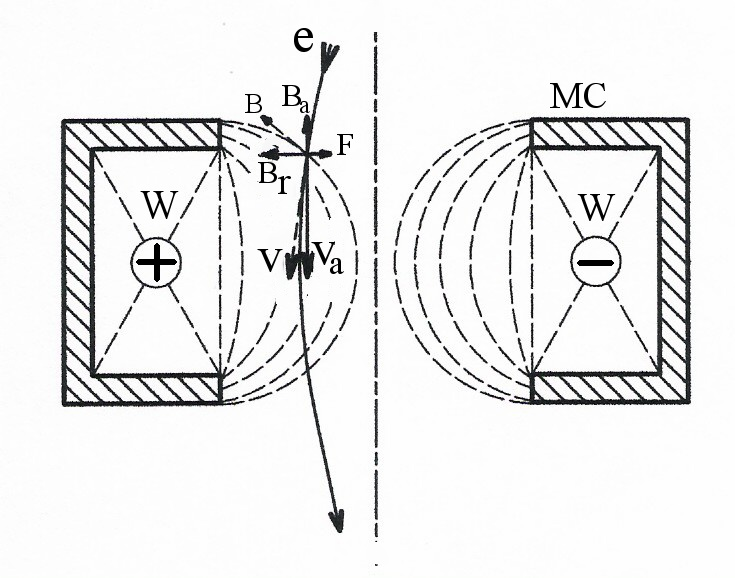
Magnetic lens

The focusing effect of a rotationally symmetrical magnetic field on the trajectory of electrons is the result of the complicated influence of a magnetic field on a moving electron. This effect is a force proportional to the induction B of the field and electron velocity v. The vector product of the radial component of induction B_{r} and axial component of velocity v_{a} is a force perpendicular to those vectors, causing the electron to move around the axis. An additional effect of this motion in the same magnetic field is another force F oriented radially to the axis, which is responsible for the focusing effect of the magnetic lens. The resulting trajectory of electrons in the magnetic lens is a curve similar to a helix. In this context variations of focal length (exciting current) cause a slight rotation of the beam cross-section.

==== Beam deflection system ====
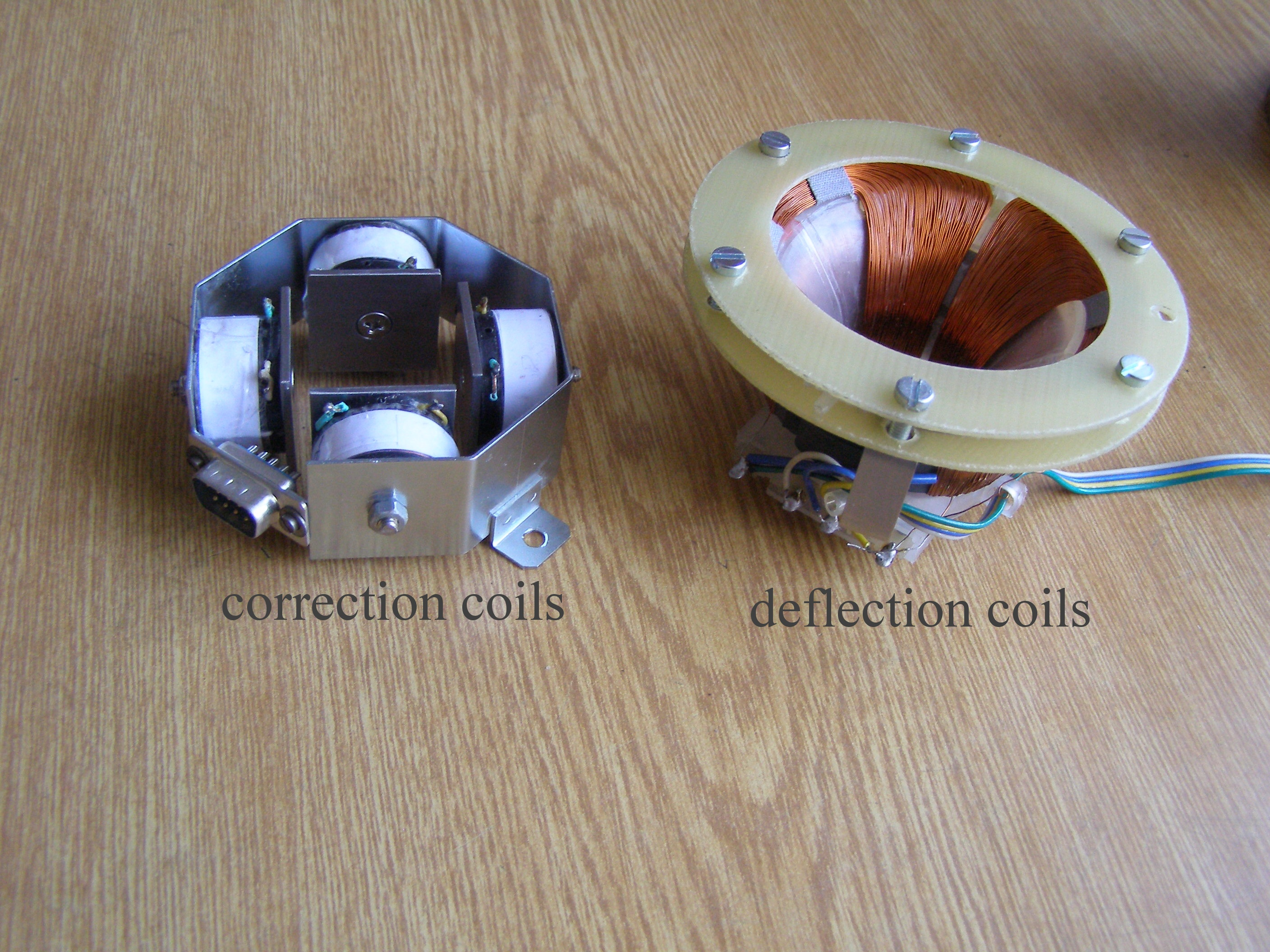
Correction and deflection coils

The beam spot must be precisely positioned with respect to the joint to be welded. This is commonly accomplished mechanically by moving the workpiece with respect to the electron gun, but sometimes it is preferable to deflect the beam instead. A system of four coils positioned symmetrically around the gun axis behind the focusing lens, producing a magnetic field perpendicular to the gun axis, is typically used for this purpose.

=== Penetration ===
==== Electron penetration ====
When electrons from the beam impact the surface of a solid, some of them are reflected (backscattered), while others penetrate the surface, where they collide with the solid. In non-elastic collisions they lose their kinetic energy. Electrons can "travel" only a small distance below the surface before they transform their kinetic energy into heat. This distance is proportional to their initial energy and inversely proportional to the density of the solid. Under typical conditions the "travel distance" is on the order of hundredths of a millimeter.

==== Beam penetration ====
By increasing the number of electrons (the beam current) the power of the beam can be increased to any desired value. By focusing the beam onto a small diameter, planar power density values as high as 10^{4} up to 10^{7} W/mm^{2} can be reached. Because electrons transfer their energy into heat in a thin layer of the solid, the power density in this volume can be high. The volume density can reach values of the order 10^{5}–10^{7} W/mm^{3}. Consequently, the temperature in this volume increases rapidly, by 10^{8}–10^{9} K/s.

=== Results ===
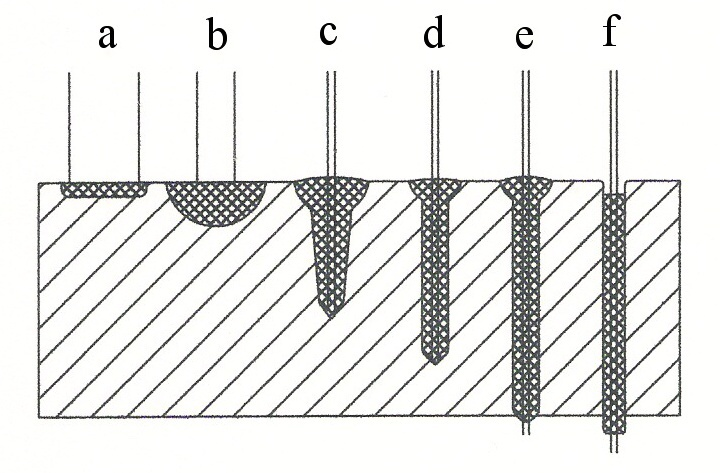
Various forms of melted zone

The results of the beam application depend on several factors:

1. Beam power – The power of the beam [W] is the product of the accelerating voltage [kV] and beam current [mA], which are easily measured and must be precisely controlled. The power is controlled by the beam current at constant voltage, usually the highest accessible.
2. Power density (beam focusing) – The power density at the spot of incidence depends on factors like the size of the cathode electron source, the optical quality of the accelerating electric lens and the focusing magnetic lens, alignment of the beam, the value of the accelerating voltage, and the focal length. All these factors (except the focal length) are a function of the design.
3. Welding speed – The welding equipment enables adjustment of the relative speed of motion of the workpiece with respect to the beam in wide enough limits, e.g., between 2 and 50 mm/s.
4. Material properties – Depending on conditions, the extent of evaporation may vary, from negligible to complete. At values of surface power density of around 10^{3} W/mm^{2} the loss of material by evaporation is negligible for most metals, which is favorable for welding.
5. Geometry (shape and dimensions) of the joint

The final effect depends on the particular combination of these parameters.

- Action of the beam at low power density or over a short interval results in melting a thin surface layer.
- A defocused beam does not penetrate, and the material at low welding speeds is heated only by conduction of the heat from the surface, producing a hemispherical melted zone.
- High power density and low speed produces a deeper and slightly conical melt zone.
- A high power density, focused beam penetrates deeper in proportion to total power.

== Welding process ==
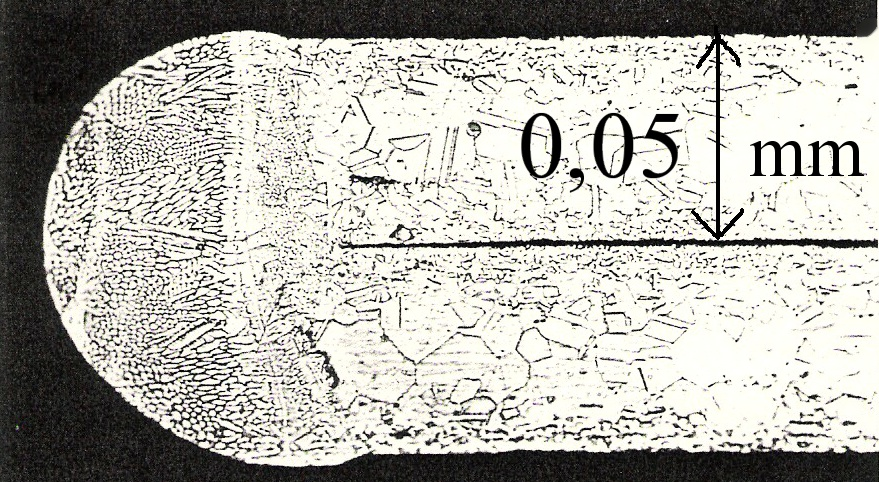
Welded membranes

=== Weldability ===
For welding thin-walled parts, appropriate welding aids are generally needed. Their construction must provide perfect contact of the parts and prevent movement during welding. Usually they have to be designed individually for a given workpiece.

Not all materials can be welded by an electron beam in a vacuum. This technology cannot be applied to materials with high vapour pressure at the melting temperature, which affects zinc, cadmium, magnesium, and practically all non-metals.

Another limitation may be the change of material properties induced by the welding process, such as a high speed of cooling.

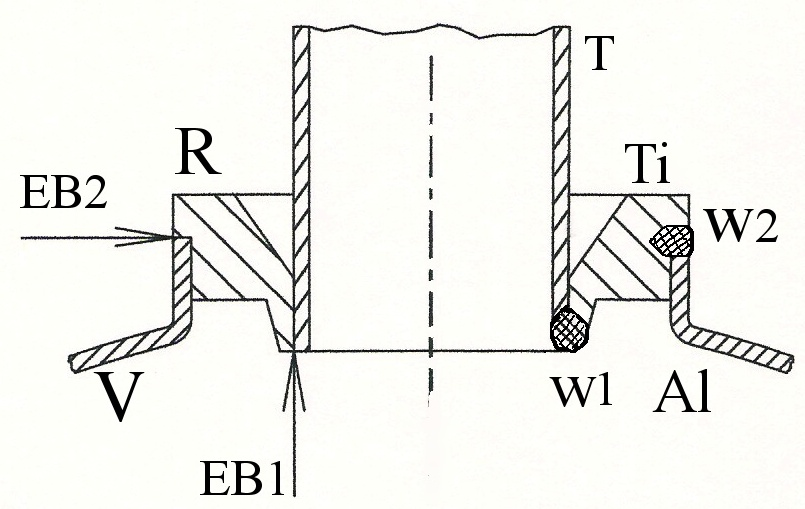
Titanium-to-aluminium joints

=== Joining dissimilar materials ===
Some metal components cannot be welded, i.e. to melt part of both in the vicinity of the joint, if the materials have different properties. It is still possible to realize joints meeting high demands for mechanical compactness and that are perfectly vacuum-tight. The principal approach is to melt the one with the lower melting point, while the other remains solid. The advantage of electron-beam welding is its ability to localize heating to a precise point and to control exactly the energy needed for the process. Higher-vacuum substantially contributes to a positive result. A general rule for construction of joints made this way is that the part with the lower melting point should be directly accessible by the beam.

=== Local vacuum ===
Local vacuum systems allow workpieces to be welded without requiring them to be enclosed in the work chamber. Instead, a vacuum is established by sealing the chamber to one section of the workpiece, welding that section, and moving the chamber or the workpiece (continuously or in discrete steps) to additional sections and repeating the process until the weld is complete. Using arc welding on pressure vessels requires 100 or more separate welds/cycles with additional processing for each cycle. Materials up to 200 mm thick can be welded in a single pass. Shrinkage is minimal (heat treatment is advisable). Welds avoid oxide or nitride contamination. The material retains strength better. The weld has fewer flaws/voids, requires less nondestructive examination (NDE), and has been in use for decades.

=== Challenges ===
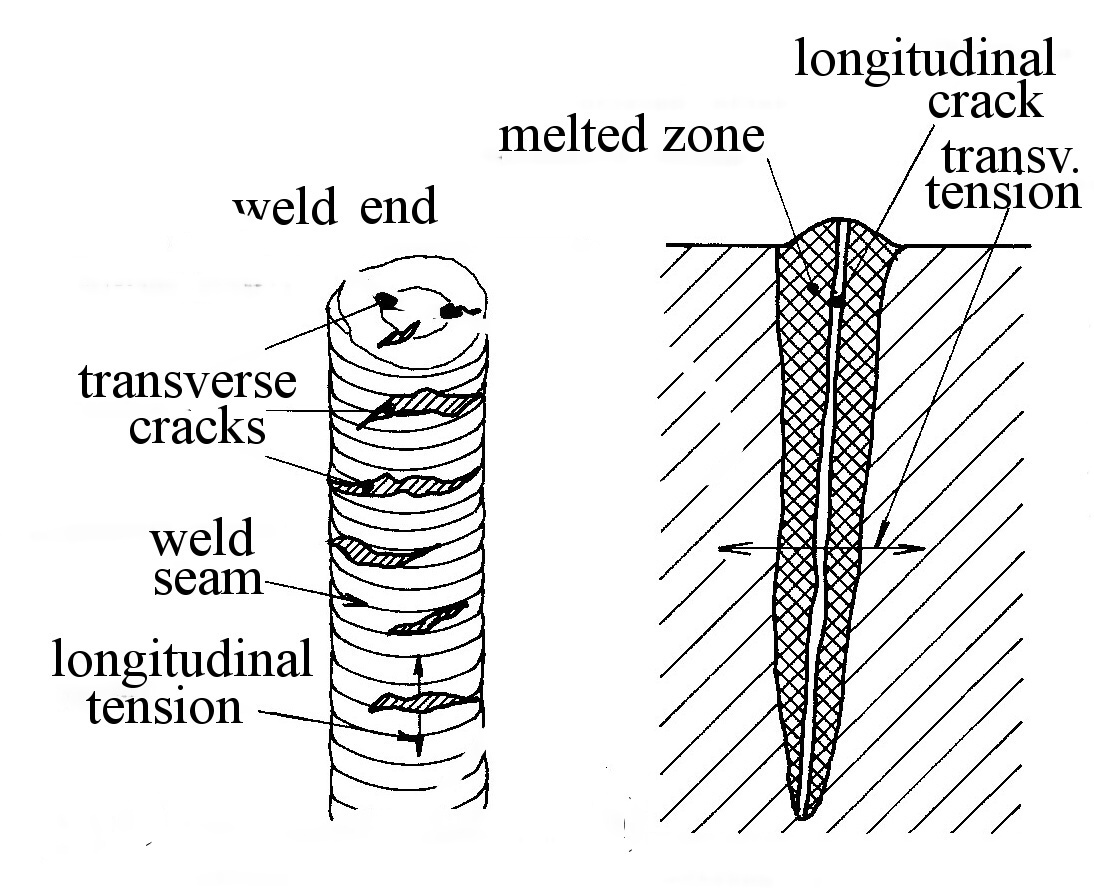
Cracks in weld

If the material melted by the beam shrinks during cooling after solidification, cracking, deformation and changes of shape may occur.

The butt weld of two plates may result in bending of the weldment because more material has been melted at the head than at the root of the weld, although this effect is not as substantial as in arc welding.

Cracks may appear in the weld. If both parts are rigid, weld shrinkage can produce high stress which may crack a brittle material (even if only after remelting by welding).

== Equipment ==
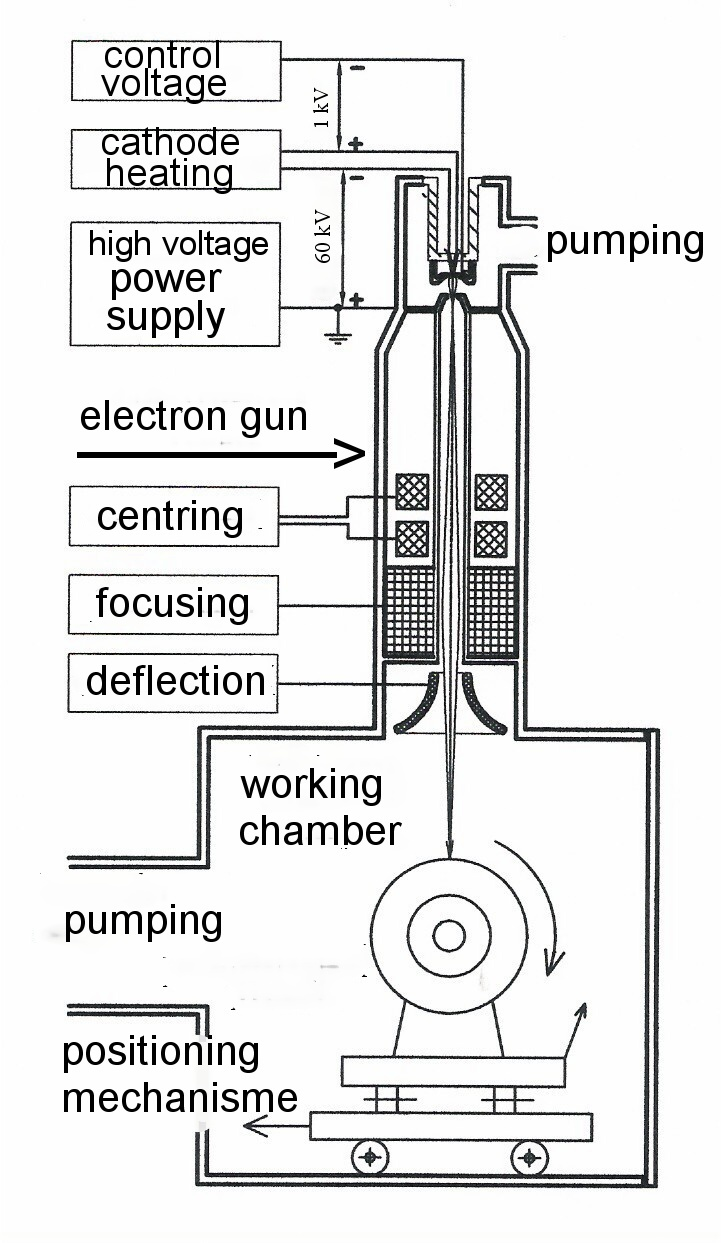
Electron-beam welder

Many welder types have been designed, differing in construction, working space volume, workpiece manipulators, and beam power. Electron-beam generators (electron guns) designed for welding applications can supply beams with power ranging from a few watts up to some one hundred kilowatts. "Micro-welds" of tiny components can be realized, as well as deep welds up to 300 mm or more. Vacuum working chamber volumes range from a few liters to hundreds of cubic meters.

The major EBW components are:

- Electron gun (beam generator)
- Vacuum chamber
- Workpiece manipulator (positioning mechanism)
- Power supply
- Control and monitoring electronics

=== Electron gun ===
==== Emitter ====
The electron gun generates, accelerates, and focuses the beam. Free electrons are gained by thermo-emission from a hot metal strap (or wire).

==== Accelerator ====
They are then accelerated and formed into a narrow beam by an electric field produced by three electrodes: the electron emitting strap, the cathode connected to the negative pole of the high (accelerating) voltage power supply (30–200 kV) and the anode. The third (Wehnelt or control) electrode is charged negatively with respect to the cathode. Its negative potential controls the portion of emitted electrons entering into the accelerating field, i.e., the electron-beam current. After passing the anode opening, the electrons move with constant speed in a slightly divergent cone.

==== Focuser ====
For technological applications the divergent beam has to be focused, which is realized by the magnetic field of a coil, the magnetic focusing lens.

The beam must be oriented to the optical axes of the accelerating electrical lens and the magnetic focusing lens. This can be done by applying a magnetic field of some specific radial direction and strength perpendicular to the optical axis before the focusing lens. This is usually realized by a simple correction system consisting of two pairs of coils. Adjusting the currents in these coils produces the correct field.

==== Deflector ====
After passing the focusing lens, the beam can be applied for welding, either directly or after deflection by a deflection system. A deflection system two pairs of coils, one each for the x and y directions. These can be used for static or dynamic deflection. Static deflection is useful for exact positioning of the beam. Dynamic deflection is realized by supplying the deflection coils with currents controlled by a computer. The beam can then be redirected to meet the needs of applications beyond welding such as surface hardening, annealing, exact beam positioning, imaging, and engraving. Resolution of 0.1 mm can be achieved.

=== Working chamber ===
Welding typically takes place in a working vacuum chamber in a high or low vacuum environment, although welders can also operate in a chamber.

Working chamber volumes range from a few liters up to hundreds of cubic meters.

=== Workpiece manipulator ===
Electron-beam welding can never be "hand-manipulated", even if not realized in vacuum, because of the presence of strong X-radiation. The relative motion of the beam and the workpiece is most often achieved by rotating or moving the workpiece or the beam.

=== Power supply ===
Electron-beam equipment must be provided with an appropriate power supply. The accelerating voltage ranges from 30–200 kV, typically 60–150 kV. Technical challenges and equipment costs are an increasing function of the operating voltage.

The high-voltage equipment must also supply low voltage current, above 5 V, for the cathode heating, and negative voltage up to about 1000 V for the control electrode.

The electron gun needs low-voltage supplies for the correction system, the focusing lens, and the deflection system.

=== Control and monitoring ===
Electronics control the workpiece manipulator, monitor the welding process, and adjust the various voltages needed for a specific application.

== Applications ==
=== Reactor pressure vessels ===
Such systems have been applied to welding reactor pressure vessels for small modular reactors, with enormous savings in time and costs over arc welding. Using arc welding on pressure vessels requires 100 or more separate welds/cycles with additional processing for each cycle. Materials up to 200 mm thick can be welded in a single pass. Shrinkage is minimal (heat treatment is advisable). Welds avoid oxide or nitride contamination. The material retains strength better. The weld has fewer flaws/voids. Less NDE is required.

=== Wind turbine ===
An offshore wind turbine can require 6000 arc-on hours of welding. Local vacuum EBM can replace this at far lower cost and time, with improved quality.

== See also ==
- Electron-beam technology
