= Decambering =

Metalworking proces

Decambering is the metalworking process of removing camber, or horizontal bend, from strip shaped materials. The material may be finite length sections or continuous coils. Decambering resembles flattening or levelling processes, but deforms the material edge (left or right) instead of the face (up or down) of the strip.

== Processes ==
Decambering may be accomplished by a choice of several processes:

The material may be "stretchformed" or stretched typically 1-2% elongation past its elastic limit, such that the camber is strained out, and the strip relaxes straight. Typically this is accomplished by routing the strip through two sets of 180 degree or more wrap driven "bridle rolls" with the second rolls rotating faster than the first. Cut strip can be gripped each end then stretched on a static rig with one end being mechanically pulled. The "stretchforming" process is most suited to thin strip.

Wider material can be flat rolled with the rolls tilting such that the "short" edge is lengthened, with thickness slightly reduced, to equal the "long" edge. The material is then straight if properly processed. Several different types of these machines are available, ranging from position controlled to pressure controlled machines. Also, machines are available with automatic self checking features. If the material has residual stress as in toothed bandsaw blades, the rolls must not uniformly apply cross strain, as the inherent strain will distort the strip. In these cases, rolls exert corrective strain in a linear narrow strip inboard of the edge each side. In the case of sawblades with teeth on, the corrective squeezed strip on the toothed edge is located along the tooth gullet, and corrective squeeze on the toothed side must be about 2.5 times the corrective force on the plain edge.

If the strip is narrow and thick enough, side rolls with guide grooves can be used to bend the material laterally to remove the camber. There are many patented designs of these machines, with the best engaging the material on both edges of the strip over the worked portion, preventing the material from twisting or "cheating" the corrective lateral bending.

Note that camber is often caused by slitting, where slitting knives extend the edge being slit. Outer edges left untreated usually have a shorter length than the inner edges being formed by slitting. The outer mults from slitting will therefore usually have camber, while inner mults frequently will not. Decamberers are cost effective when material is not laterally straight enough to suit a given process, and needs upgrading. Cambered material is usually lower in cost than straight material, and decamberers offer savings in these cases. Various types of decambering machines cater to wide or narrow materials.
