= Dip moulding =

Process of shaping of plastics by moulding

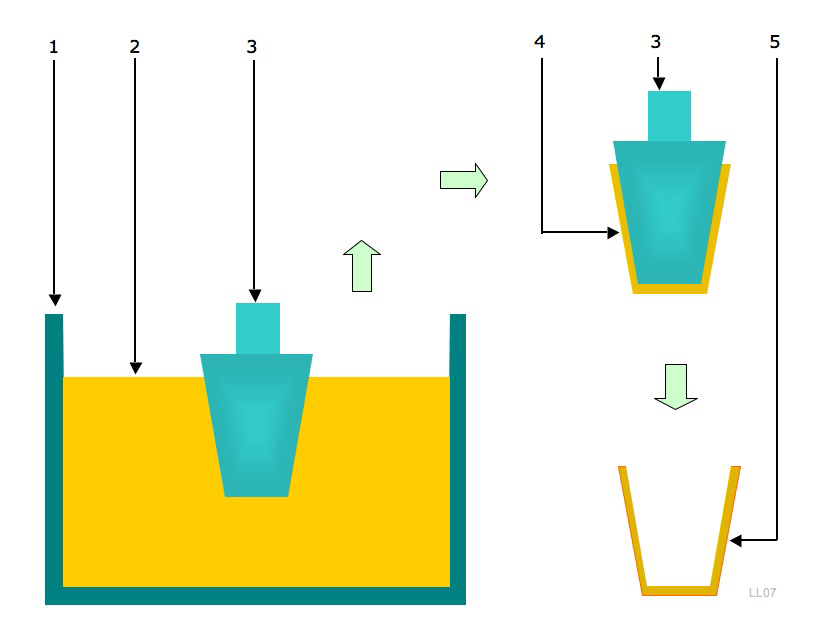
Illustration of dip moulding

In plastics processing, dip molding is a process of shaping of plastics by moulding. The coating of components with PVC has many applications. Plastic dip moulding is a technique where metal parts are coated with a plastic vinyl material. It is used to protect and make the metal parts more resistant to scratches and abrasions.

== Applications ==
The main applications are the gloves, balloons, bellows...

== Materials ==
Plastisol is the most used material for dip moulding because it is easy to use and affordable. Other materials are used, such as latex, leneoprene, polyurethanes, silicones and even epoxy.

== Operating Mode ==
The plastic can be heated or not according to their physical state at room temperature. In the case of a powder, the plastic is fluidized.

The following steps constitute the dip moulding process:

- mould heating;
- heated mould dipped into the plastic material;
- removal of the mould;
- excess drainage;
- drying or curing of the plastics material still attached to the mould if it contained a solvent or was based reagents (monomers, prepolymers) reagents;
- cooling of the plastic still attached to the mould;
- releasing of the part from the mold after its solidification.

The part may need to be submerged several times to give the desired thickness.

== Control of the thickness ==
To control the thickness of the workpiece, it is important to control the following settings:

- the mould temperature: higher the temperature, higher the thickness of the workpiece.
- the temperature of the material;
- the speed dipping of the mould;
- the duration of the immersion: this time increases the thickness of the workpiece.
- the output speed of the mould: this speed increases the thickness of the workpiece.

== Advantages and disadvantages ==
Dip moulding presents advantages and disadvantages.

=== Advantages ===
- low investment cost
- low cost of production
- different possible thicknesses without the need to change the mold
- complex parts can be removed easily from the mold thanks to their elasticity

=== Disadvantages ===
- relatively slow process
- control of the thickness is difficult

== See also ==
- Dip-coating
