= Micromachining =

Micromachining may refer to:

The technique for fabrication of 3D and 2D structures on the micrometer scale.

- Superfinishing, a metalworking process for producing very fine surface finishes
- Various microelectromechanical systems
  - Bulk micromachining
  - Surface micromachining
  - High-aspect-ratio microstructure technologies

== See also ==
- High aspect ratio (HAR) silicon micromachining
