= Manufacturing in Chad =

As of 1990, manufacturing in Chad was dominated by agribusiness, and Cotontchad in particular. Next in importance were the National Sugar Company of Chad (Société Nationale Sucrière du Tchad—SONASUT), the Chadian Textile Company (Société Tchadienne de Textile—STT), the Logone Breweries (Brasseries du Logone—BdL), and the Cigarette Factory of Chad (Manufacture des Cigarettes du Tchad—MCT). Observers estimated that these five industries generated some 20 percent of GDP. Of lesser importance were the Farcha Slaughterhouse (Abattoir Frigorifique de Farcha), the Industrial Agricultural Equipment Company (Société Industrielle de Matériel Agricole du Tchad—SIMAT), and Soft Drinks of Chad (Boissons Gazeuses du Tchad—BGT).

Before the warfare of the 1979-82 period, Chad's industrial sector included between 80 and 100 small and medium enterprises, in addition to the major manufacturing industries. Most of these processed agricultural products, or competed in the import/export trade. About half were local subsidiaries of foreign-owned firms or were Chadian firms with significant foreign capital. The foreign-owned distributorships sold agricultural equipment, construction materials, and petroleum products.

== Chadian Civil War ==
During the civil war in Chad (1979-1982), the facilities and equipment of many industries were badly damaged. Most industrial operations either ceased or were reduced greatly, and almost all foreign investors withdrew from the country. Those operations that did continue on a reduced scale were limited to the Soudanian region, which was not involved directly in large-scale fighting. By 1983, with the re-establishment of political stability on a national scale, the five major industrial concerns resumed full operations, and the less significant ones, such as SIMAT and the BGT, were rebuilt.

== Post-war ==
Since 1983 the return of foreign investment has been slow because of the high costs of rebuilding and a continuing perception of political uncertainty. Of the approximately twenty enterprises that had reopened by the late 1980s, most were import-export enterprises that lacked a formal relationship with the banking sector. Most Chadian-owned enterprises had managed to re-establish themselves. Yet by 1986, small enterprises that had assembled bicycles, motorcycles, and radios remained closed.

The lack of access to credit was another impediment to business expansion in Chad. Despite the reopening in 1983 of the Bank of Central African States and of two commercial banks, the International Bank for Africa in Chad (Banque Internationale pour l'Afrique au Tchad—BIAT) and the Chadian Credit and Deposit Bank (Banque Tchadienne de Crédit et de Dépôt—BTCD), the high proportion of available credit going to Chad's major industries limited credit available to smaller enterprises. Moreover, the banks invoked strict criteria for loan eligibility because of the high risk of lending in Chad. Few owners of small businesses knew sufficient accounting and technical skills to meet bank information requirements for loans.

== Ownership ==
With the exception of the two bottling companies (the BGT and the BdL), which were privately owned, all the other important industries were either parastatals with majority government ownership or mixed companies with important government participation. For the most part, private participation was limited to French investors; investment by private Chadian interests was extremely rare. French companies were also important shareholders in the larger Chadian companies, such as Cotontchad. Except for Cotontchad, whose top management was Chadian, all the other major industries were run by expatriate directors, accountants, and mid-level managers who, for the most part, were French.

== Industrial output ==
Industrial output grew rapidly in 1983 and 1984, as industries resumed operations that had been interrupted by war. By 1984 and 1985, prewar levels of output had been either reached or exceeded. Growth slowed for all industries after 1985, however, because of the dramatic downturn of world cotton prices, and output in 1986 began to decline.

Cotton fiber production by Cotontchad, which directly reflected production of raw cotton, fell sharply in 1985. This decline was stabilized in 1986-87 by emergency support from international donors. These donors prescribed retrenchment programs to prevent the total collapse of the cotton industry. The restrictions imposed on the production of ginned cotton fiber, however, reduced by half the number of ginning mills, with raw cotton production limited to about 100,000 tons. Production of edible oils by Cotontchad was also affected by the program of cost savings.

Other industries were affected directly by the fall of cotton prices. STT textile production slowed, as did the production of agricultural equipment by SIMAT, which made plowing equipment for use in cotton planting. Furthermore, the drop in revenues to farmers in the soudanian zone for their cotton and peanut production affected their ability to buy equipment. Lost revenues to farmers, along with the reduction in the numbers of workers needed in ginning operations, took a toll on cash earnings and therefore on buying power. By 1986 the ripple effect of these lost revenues in the cotton sector was widespread. The downturn in production in all industries left Chad with considerable unused capacity, ranging from 15 to 50 percent.

== Impediments to industry ==
A number of other factors resulted in the slump in Chadian industry. Commercial sale of goods was low in a largely cash poor or nonmonetary economy. The decline in the cotton sector, which had provided the largest infusion of cash into the economy, further reduced consumer demand. Another impediment to industry was the high local cost of production compared with the cost of production in neighboring countries. Factors that raised local production costs included high transportation costs, overdependence on imports, and restricted economies of scale for small operations. Imported inputs were equivalent to about 30 percent of industrial turnover for Cotontchad, the BdL, and the STT and to about 60 percent for the MCT. Local substitutes for inputs were often more expensive than imported equivalents. Imports were often marketed to subsidize local production by a given industry. An example was SONASUT's importing refined sugar at less than local production costs, selling it locally, and using the proceeds to subsidize sugarcane production on SONASUT plantations. Interlocking relationships of production among companies also kept production costs high. For example, the BGT used SONASUT's refined sugar in its production of soft drinks, according to a convention with the government to use local inputs, even though imported refined sugar was cheaper.
