= Electron-beam machining =

Electron-beam machining (EBM) is a process where high-velocity electrons concentrated into a narrow beam that are directed towards the work piece, creating heat and vaporizing the material. EBM can be used for very precise cutting or boring of a wide variety of metals. Surface finish is better and kerf width is narrower than those for other thermal cutting processes.

EBM process is best suitable for high melting point and high thermal conductivity materials.

The EBM beam is operated in pulse mode. This is achieved by appropriately biasing the biased grid located just after the cathode. Switching pulses are given to the bias grid so as to achieve pulse duration of as low as 50 μs to as long as 15 ms. Beam current is directly related to the number of electrons emitted by the cathode or available in the beam. Beam current can be as low as 200 μamp to 1 amp. Increasing the beam current directly increases the energy per pulse. Similarly, increase in pulse duration also enhances energy per pulse. High-energy pulses (in excess of 100 J/pulse) can machine larger holes on thicker plates. The energy density and power density is governed by energy per pulse duration and spot size. Spot size, on the other hand is controlled by the degree of focusing achieved by the electromagnetic lenses. If a higher energy density is combined with a smaller spot size, the material removal would be faster though the size of the hole would be smaller. The plane of focusing would be on or just beneath the surface of the work piece. The electron beam is generated by the potential difference between the negatively-charged cathode and the positively-charged anode.

== Equipment ==
EBM equipment in construction is similar to electron beam welding machines (see electron beam welding). EBM machines usually utilize voltages in the range of 150 to 200 kV to accelerate electrons to about 200,000 km/s. Magnetic lenses are used to focus the electron beam to the surface of the work-piece. By means of electromagnetic deflection system the beam is positioned as needed, usually by means of a computer.

== Considerations ==
Vacuums must be used to reduce contamination, and minimize electron collisions with air molecules. Because work must be done in a vacuum, EBM is best suited for small parts. The interaction of the electron beam with the work piece produces hazardous x-rays, and only highly trained personnel should use EBM equipment.

== See also ==
- Electron beam technology
