= Material removal rate =

Statistic for machining tools

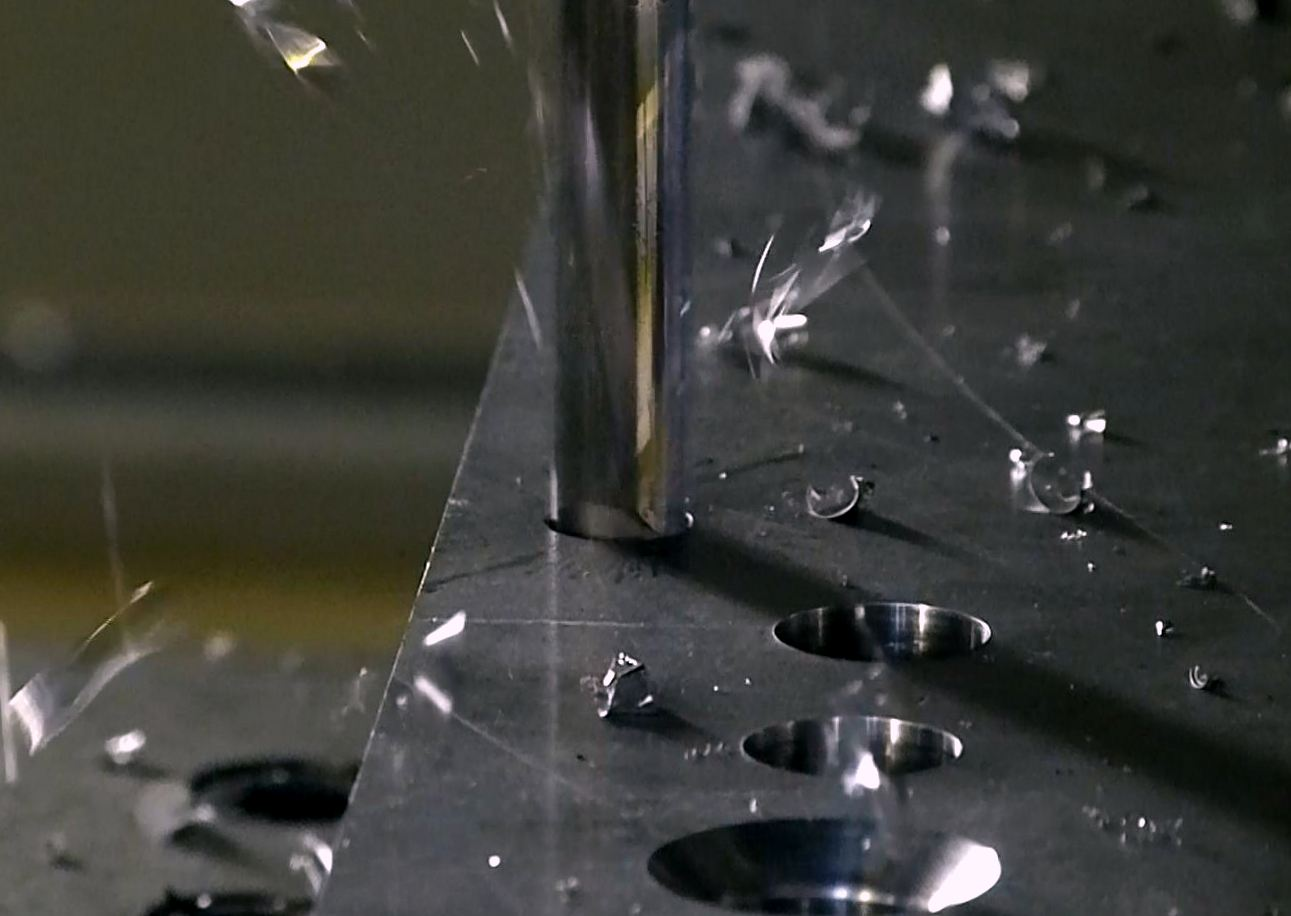
Shavings from drilling in a piece of metal.

Material removal rate (MRR) is the amount of material removed per time unit (usually per minute) when performing machining operations such as using a lathe or milling machine. The more material removed per minute, the higher the material removal rate. The MRR is a single number that enables you to do this. It is a direct indicator of how efficiently you are cutting, and how productive you are. MRR is the volume of material removed per minute. The higher your cutting parameters, the higher the MRR.

Phrased in another way, the MRR is equal to the volume of residue formed as a direct result of the removal from the workpiece per unit of time during a cutting operation.

The material removal rate in a work process can be calculated as the depth of the cut, times the width of the cut, times the feed rate. The material removal rate is typically measured in cubic centimeters per minute (cm^{3}/min).
