= Abrasive machining =

Machining Process

Abrasive machining is a machining process where material is removed from a workpiece using a multitude of small abrasive particles. Common examples include grinding, honing, and polishing. Abrasive processes are usually expensive, but capable of tighter tolerances and better surface finish than other machining processes

== Mechanics of abrasive machining ==
Abrasive machining works by forcing the abrasive particles, or grains, into the surface of the workpiece so that each particle cuts away a small bit of material. Abrasive machining is similar to conventional machining, such as milling or turning, because each of the abrasive particles acts like a miniature cutting tool. However, unlike conventional machining the grains are much smaller than a cutting tool, and the geometry and orientation of individual grains are not well defined. As a result, abrasive machining is less power efficient and generates more heat. The grain size may be different based on the machining. For rough grinding, coarse abrasives are used. For fine grinding, fine grains (abrasives) are used.

== Abrasive machining processes ==
Abrasive machining processes can be divided into two categories based on how the grains are applied to the workpiece.

In bonded abrasive processes, the particles are held together within a matrix, and their combined shape determines the geometry of the finished workpiece. For example, in grinding the particles are bonded together in a wheel. As the grinding wheel is fed into the part, its shape is transferred onto the workpiece.

In loose abrasive processes, there is no structure connecting the grains. They may be applied without lubrication as dry powder, or they may be mixed with a lubricant to form a slurry. Since the grains can move independently, they must be forced into the workpiece with another object like a polishing cloth or a lapping plate.

Common abrasive processes are listed below.

=== Fixed (bonded) abrasive processes ===
- Grinding
- Honing, superfinishing
- Tape finishing, abrasive belt machining
- Abrasive sawing, Diamond wire cutting, Wire saw
- Sanding

=== Loose abrasive processes ===
- Polishing
- Lapping
- Abrasive flow machining (AFM)
- Hydro-erosive grinding
- Water-jet cutting
- Abrasive blasting
- Mass finishing, tumbling
  - Open barrel tumbling
  - Vibratory bowl tumbling
  - Centrifugal disc tumbling
  - Centrifugal barrel tumbling

== Abrasives ==
The most important property of an abrasive is its hardness. For abrasive grains to effectively cut, they must be significantly harder than the workpiece material. They can be grouped based on their hardness into two categories: conventional abrasives and superabrasives.

Conventional abrasive materials have been used since the advent of machining. They are made of materials that exist naturally on Earth, and they are abundant and cheap. Conventional abrasives can suitably machine most materials.

Superabrasives are much harder than conventional abrasives. Since they are much more expensive, they are used when conventional abrasives will not suffice.

Common abrasives are listed below.

=== Conventional ===
- Aluminium oxide (Corundum)
- Silicon carbide
- Emery
- Pumice
- Sand
- Steel abrasive

=== Superabrasives ===
- Diamond
- Cubic Boron Nitride (CBN), Borazon

== See also ==
- Superfinishing
