= Surface finishing =

Range of processes that alter the surface of an item to achieve a certain property

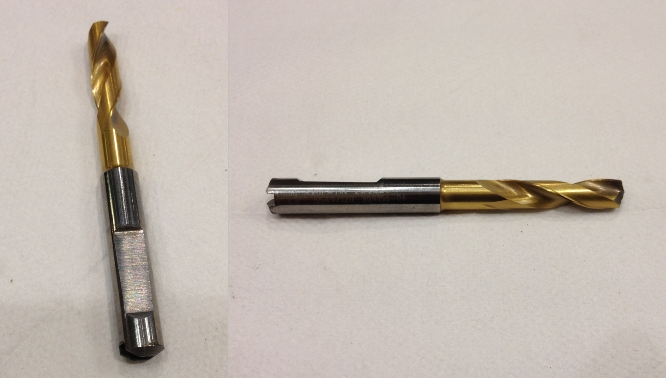
A drill bit with surface finishing to make the cutting edges harder

Surface finishing is a broad range of industrial processes that alter the surface of a manufactured item to achieve a certain property. Finishing processes may be employed to: improve product appearance, adhesion or wettability, solderability, corrosion resistance, tarnish resistance, the chemical resistance, the wear resistance, hardness, modify electrical conductivity, remove burrs and other surface flaws, and control the surface friction. In limited cases some of these techniques can be used to restore original dimensions to salvage or repair an item. An unfinished surface is often called mill finish. These processes can improve the durability, performance and even the appearance of the surface being finished. Surface finishing is often one of the final steps taken when working metal and is essential for guaranteeing that metal components meet the requirements of the necessary finish.

Surface finishing processes can be categorized by how they affect the workpiece:

- Removing or reshaping finishing
- Adding or altering finishing
- Coating Methods
- Chemical Treatments
- Mechanical Treatments

Mechanical processes may also be categorized together because of similarities in the final surface finish.

== Adding and altering ==
- Blanching
- Burnishing
- Calendering
- Case hardening
- Ceramic glaze
- Cladding
- Corona treatment
- Diffusion processes:
  - Carburizing
  - Nitriding
- Electroless plating
- Electroplating
- Galvanizing
- Gilding
- Glazing
- Knurling
- Painting
- Passivation/Conversion coating
  - Anodizing
  - Bluing
  - Chromate conversion coating
  - Phosphate conversion coating
    - Parkerizing
  - Plasma electrolytic oxidation
- Peening
  - Shot peening
  - Laser peening
- Pickling
- Plasma spraying
- Powder coating
- Thin-film deposition
  - Chemical vapor deposition (CVD)
  - Electroplating
  - Electrophoretic deposition (EPD)
  - Mechanical plating
  - Sputter deposition
  - Physical vapor deposition (PVD)
  - Vacuum plating
- Vitreous enamel

== Removing and reshaping ==
- Abrasive blasting
  - Sandblasting
- Burnishing
- Chemical-mechanical planarization (CMP)
- Electropolishing
- Electrochemical machining
- Flame polishing
- Gas cluster ion beam
- Grinding
- Industrial etching
- Laser ablation
- Laser engraving
- Linishing
- Magnetic field-assisted finishing
- Mass finishing processes
  - Tumble finishing
  - Vibratory finishing
- Peening
  - Shot peening
  - Laser peening
- Pickling
- Polishing
  - Buffing
  - Lapping
- Superfinishing

== Mechanical finishing ==
Mechanical finishing processes include:

- Abrasive blasting
- Burnishing
- Grinding
  - Honing
- Mass finishing
  - Tumble finishing
  - Vibratory finishing
- Polishing
  - Buffing
  - Lapping

The use of abrasives in metal polishing results in what is considered a "mechanical finish".

=== Metal finish designations ===
#1 Finish

Annealed and descaled after hot rolling, this finish is suitable for industrial applications requiring heat resistance and corrosion resistance, where smoothness of finish is unimportant, such as chemical tanks, aircraft heaters, steam turbine shrouds and piping.

#3 Finish

Also known as grinding, roughing or rough grinding. These finishes are coarse in nature and usually are a preliminary finish applied before manufacturing. An example would be grinding gates off of castings, deburring or removing excess weld material. It is coarse in appearance and applied by using 36–100 grit abrasive.

When the finish is specified as #3, the material is polished to a uniform 60–80 grit.

#4 Architectural finish

Also known as brushed, directional or satin finish. A #4 architectural finish is characterized by fine polishing grit lines that are uniform and directional in appearance. It is produced by polishing the metal with a 120–180 grit belt or wheel finish and then softened with an 80–120 grit greaseless compound or a medium non-woven abrasive belt or pad.

#4 Dairy or sanitary finish

This finish is commonly used for the medical and food industry and almost exclusively used on stainless steel. This finish is much finer than a #4 architectural finish. This finish enhances the physical appearance of the metal as well as increases the sanitary benefits. One takes great care to remove any surface defects in the metal, like pits, that could allow bacteria to grow. A #4 dairy or sanitary finish is produced by polishing with a 180–240 grit belt or wheel finish softened with 120–240 grit greaseless compound or a fine non-woven abrasive belt or pad.

#6 Finish

Also known as a fine satin finish. This finish is produced by polishing with a 220–280 grit belt or wheel softened with a 220–230 grit greaseless compound or very fine non-woven abrasive belt or pad. Polishing lines will be soft and less reflective than a #4 architectural finish.

#7 Finish

A #7 finish is produced by polishing with a 280–320 grit belt or wheel and sisal buffing with a cut and color compound. This is a semi-bright finish that will still have some polishing lines, but they will be very dull. Carbon steel and iron are commonly polished to a #7 finish before chrome plating. A #7 finish can be made bright by color buffing with coloring compound and a cotton buff. This is commonly applied to keep polishing costs down when a part needs to be shiny but not flawless.

#8 Finish

Also known as a mirror finish. This finish is produced by polishing with at least a 320-grit belt or wheel finish. Care will be taken in making sure all surface defects are removed. The part is sisal buffed and then color buffed to achieve a mirror finish. The quality of this finish is dependent on the quality of the metal being polished. Some alloys of steel and aluminum cannot be brought to a mirror finish. Castings that have slag or pits will also be difficult, if not impossible, to polish to a #8. A polished PVD finish can achieve a similar appearance due to the smooth, reflective nature of the coating process.

== See also ==
- Surface engineering
- Surface science
- Textile finishing
