= Glazing jack =

Machine used for polishing leather

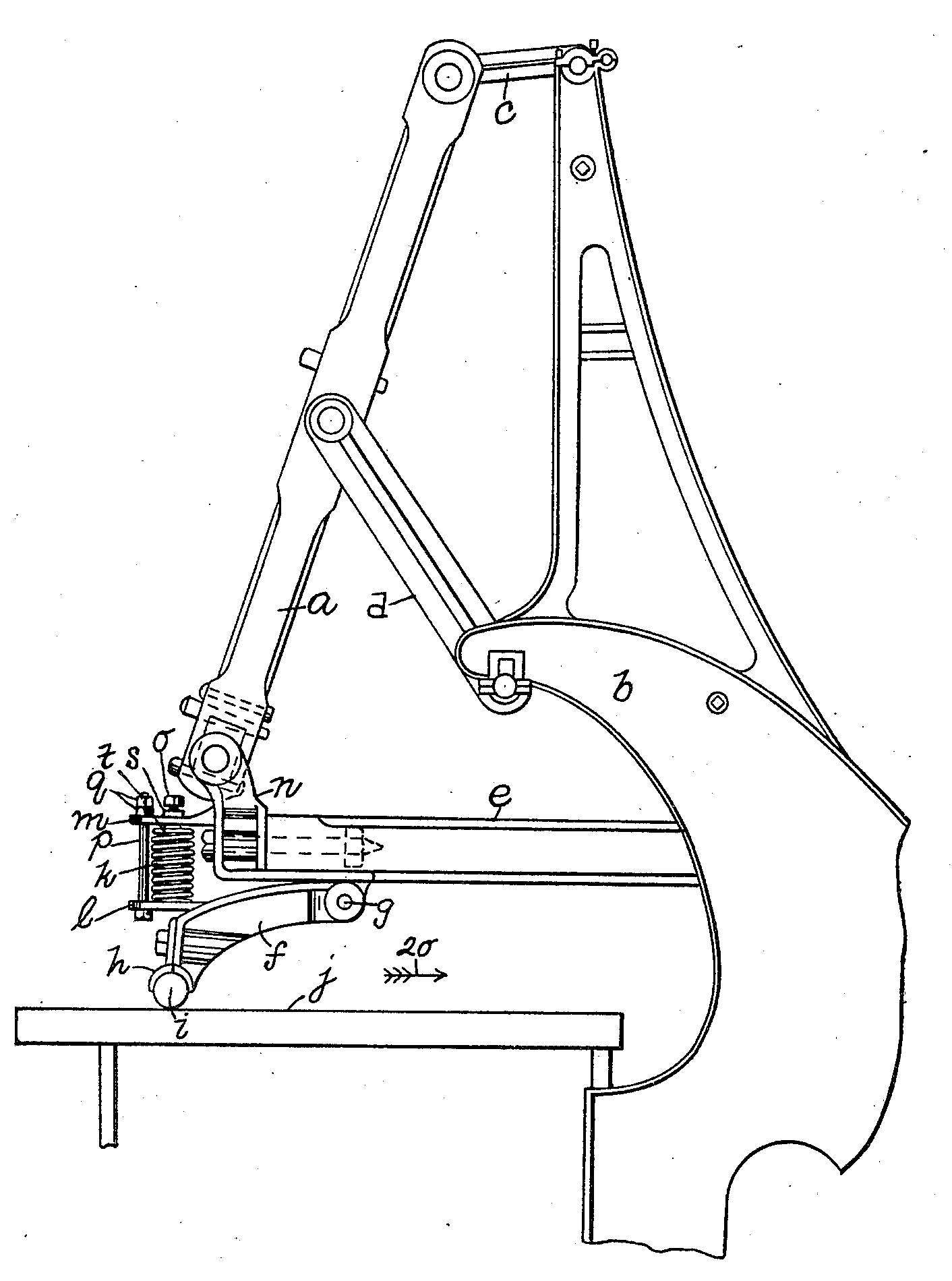
Diagram of a typical glazing jack, from a 1901 patent

A glazing jack or glazing machine is a type of machine used for polishing leather. The machine consists of a solid glass cylinder, typically around two inches (5 cm) in diameter and six inches (15 cm) in length, mounted to the end of a rotating or reciprocating arm. The arm repeatedly and rapidly draws the glass across the surface of the leather, with significant downward pressure, as the operator moves the leather underneath the arm.

The repeated stroking of the leather smooths and compresses the surface and raises various color tones. Heat generated by friction during the glazing process can darken and harden the aniline finish of the leather, and can raise oils in the leather to the surface. Because no pigment is used, the porous structure of the leather remains visible, providing a depth to its appearance. The operator of the glazing jack can control the surface finish by varying the pressure of the tool and the number of strokes applied. Similarly to glazing, a copper or glass tool can be drawn across the leather by hand to create "sleeked" and "glassed" finishes, respectively.

Because jacking leather is a time-consuming and labor-intensive process, it is often reserved for more expensive or exotic leathers, such as reptile leathers.

== See also ==
- Surface finishing
