= Electroetching =

Electroetching is a metal etching process that involves the use of a solution of an electrolyte, an anode, and a cathode. The metal piece to be etched is connected to the positive pole of a source of direct electric current. A piece of the same metal is connected to the negative pole of the direct current source and is called the cathode.

In order to reduce unwanted electrochemical effects, the anode and the cathode should be of the same metal. Similarly the cation of the electrolyte should be of the same metal as well. When the current source is turned on, the metal of the anode is dissolved and converted into the same cation as in the electrolyte and at the same time an equal amount of the cation in the solution is converted into metal and deposited on the cathode.

Depending on the voltage used and the concentration of the electrolyte, other, more complex electrochemical effects can take place at the anode and the cathode but the solution at the anode and deposition at the cathode are the main effects.

== See also ==
- Chemical milling
- Electro-Glo Distribution
- Electropolishing
- Etching
- Nontoxic etching (mentions anodic etching)
- Glass etching
- Surface finishing
