= HEG =

HEG may refer to:

== Places ==
- Mount Heg, Victory Mountains, Antarctica
- Herlong Recreational Airport, Jacksonville, Florida, US (FAA LID:HEG)

== Science and technology ==
- Hemoencephalography
- Homing endonuclease genes
- Homogeneous electron gas
- Host Europe Group, a web hosting company in the UK
- Hydro-erosive grinding
- Hyperemesis gravidarum, a complication of pregnancy

== Other uses ==
- Hans Christian Heg (1829–1863), Norwegian-American politician and soldier
- Helong language, spoken on Timor (ISO 639-3:heg)
