= Mill finish =

Surface texture of metal after exiting a rolling mill or others

Mill finish is the surface texture (or finish) of metal after it exits a rolling mill, extrusion die, or drawing processes, including sheet, bar, plate, or structural shapes. This texture is usually rough and lacks lustre; it may have spots of oxidation or contamination with mill oil. Most mill finish surfaces are machined or treated with polishing, industrial etching, or some other surface finishing process before they are considered complete.

The quality and characteristics of mill finish can vary widely from one mill to another, and even from one lot (set of similar parts all processed consecutively or in a short time) to another. Hot rolled parts are usually dark and dull, their surface oxidized from being hot worked. Extruded products may have die marks running the length of the stock. Other mill finishes are surprisingly smooth and uniform.

It is possible for a mill to influence the finish of produced stock. Carefully maintained and polished rollers can increase the smoothness and lustre of their product, and some rolling mills will follow rolling with an annealling process to give the stock a matte finish.

== Sources ==
- Zahner, L. William (1995). Architectural Metals: A Guide to Selection, Specification, and Performance (Illustrated ed.). John Wiley & Sons. pp. 162–163. ISBN 0471045063.
- Tracton, Arthur A. (2005). Coatings Technology Handbook (3rd ed.). CRC Press. pp. 14–5. ISBN 1574446495.
