= Polishing (metalworking) =

Abrasive process for creating smooth finished surfaces

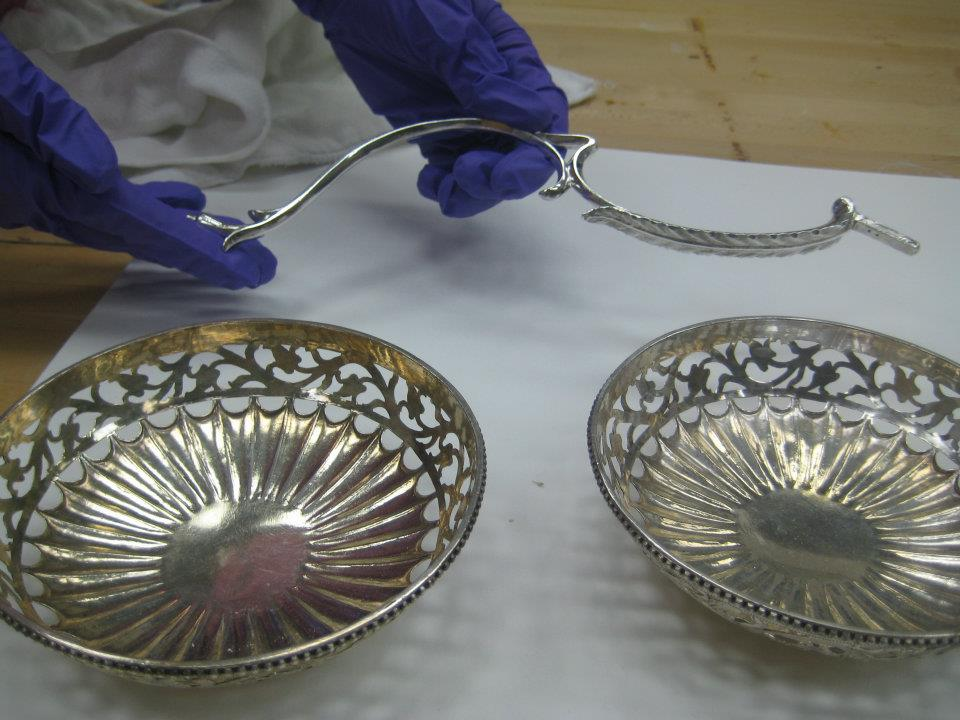
A tarnished and unpolished silvern bowl (left) and a polished silvern piece (right). There is a visible difference in cleanliness and color. The piece held above the two bowls has also been polished. (These pieces are part of an 18th-century silvern epergne in the collection of the Indianapolis Museum of Art).

Polishing and buffing are finishing processes for smoothing a workpiece's surface using an abrasive and a work wheel or a leather strop. Technically, polishing refers to processes that uses an abrasive that is glued to the work wheel, while buffing uses a loose abrasive applied to the work wheel. Polishing is a more aggressive process, while buffing is less harsh, which leads to a smoother, brighter finish. A common misconception is that a polished surface has a mirror-bright finish, however, most mirror-bright finishes are actually buffed.

Polishing is often used to enhance the appearance of an item, prevent contamination of instruments, remove oxidation, create a reflective surface, or prevent corrosion in pipes. In metallography and metallurgy, polishing is used to create a flat, defect-free surface for examination of a metal's microstructure under a microscope. Silicon-based polishing pads or a diamond solution can be used in the polishing process. Polishing stainless steel can also increase its sanitary benefits.

The removal of oxidization (tarnish) from metal objects is accomplished using a metal polish or tarnish remover; this is also called polishing. To prevent further unwanted oxidization, polished metal surfaces may be coated with wax, oil, or lacquer. This is of particular concern for copper alloy products such as brass and bronze.

While used less extensively than traditional mechanical polishing, electropolishing is an alternative form of polishing that uses the principles of electrochemistry to remove microscopic layers of metal from a base surface. This method of polishing can be fine-tuned to give a wide range of finishes, from matte to mirror-bright. Electropolishing also has an advantage over traditional manual polishing in that the finished product will not experience the compression and deformation traditionally associated with the polishing process.

== Process ==
The condition of the material at hand determines what type of abrasive will be applied. The first stage, if the material is unfinished, starts with a rough abrasive (perhaps 60 or 80 grit) and each subsequent stage uses a finer abrasive, such as 120, 180, 220/240, 320, 400 and higher grit abrasives, until the desired finish is achieved. The rough (i.e. large grit) passes remove imperfections within the metal surface like pits, nicks, lines and scratches. The finer abrasives leave progressively finer lines that are not visible to the naked eye. A no. 8 ("mirror") finish requires polishing and buffing compounds, and polishing wheels attached to high speed polishing machines or electric drills. Lubricants like wax and kerosene may be used as lubricating and cooling media during these operations, although some polishing materials are specifically designed to be used "dry." Buffing may be done by hand with a stationary polisher or die grinder, or it may be automated using specialized equipment.

When buffing there are two types of buffing motions: the cut motion and the color motion. The cut motion is designed to give a uniform, smooth, semi-bright surface finish. This is achieved by moving the workpiece against the rotation of the buffing wheel, while using medium to hard pressure. The color motion gives a clean, bright, shiny surface finish. This is achieved by moving the workpiece with the rotation of the buffing wheel, while using medium to light pressure.

When polishing brass (a softer metal) there are often minute marks in the metal caused by impurities.

Polishing operations for items such as chisels, hammers, screwdrivers, wrenches, etc., are given a fine finish but not plated. In order to achieve this finish four operations are required: roughing, dry fining, greasing, and coloring. Note that roughing is usually done on a solid grinding wheel and for an extra fine polish the greasing operation may be broken up into two operations: rough greasing and fine greasing. However, for inexpensive items money is saved by only performing the first two operations.

Polishing knives and cutlery is known as fine glazing or blue glazing. Sand buffing, when used on German silver, white metal, etc., is technically a buffing operation because it uses a loose abrasive, but removes a significant amount of material, like polishing.

=== Equipment ===
White and grey aluminium oxide abrasives are used on high tensile strength metals, such as carbon and alloy steel, tough iron, and nonferrous alloys. Gray silicon carbide abrasives are used on hard and brittle substances, such as grey iron and cemented carbide, and low tensile strength metals, such as brass, aluminium, and copper. Green chromium(III) oxide is the abrasive used in green compounds that are typically used to finish ferrous metals (steels).

Polishing wheels come in a wide variety of types to fulfil a wide range of needs. The most common materials used for polishing wheels are wood, leather, canvas, cotton cloth, plastic, felt, paper, sheepskin, impregnated rubber, canvas composition, and wool; leather and canvas are the most common. Wooden wheels have emery or other abrasives glued onto them and are used to polish flat surfaces and maintain good edges. There are many types of cloth wheels. Cloth wheels that are cemented together are very hard and used for rough work, whereas other cloth wheels that are sewn and glued together are not as aggressive. There are cloth wheels that are not glued or cemented, and instead are sewn and have metal side plates for support. Solid felt wheels are popular for fine finishes. Hard roughing wheels can be made by cementing together strawboard paper disks. Softer paper wheels are made from felt paper. Most wheels are run at approximately 7500 surface feet per minute (SFM), however muslin, felt and leather wheels are usually run at 4000 SFM.

Buffing wheels, also known as mops, are either made from cotton or wool cloth and come bleached or unbleached. Specific types include: sisal, spiral sewn, loose cotton, canton flannel, domet flannel, denim, treated spiral sewn, cushion, treated vented, untreated vented, string buff, finger buff, sisal rope, mushroom, facer, tampered, scrubbing mushroom, hourglass buff, rag, "B", climax, swansdown, airflow, coolair, and bullet.

The following chart will help in deciding which wheels and compounds to use when polishing different materials. This chart is a starting point and experienced polishers may vary the materials used to suit different applications.

Common buffing compound and wheel combinations
	Plastics			Silver, gold & thin plates			Nickel & chrome plating			Copper, brass, aluminium, pot metal & soft metals			Steel & iron			Stainless steel		
Buff type	Rough	Initial buff	Final buff	Rough	Initial buff	Final buff	Rough	Initial buff	Final buff	Rough	Initial buff	Final buff	Rough	Initial buff	Final buff	Rough	Initial buff	Final buff
Sisal										Yes			Yes			Yes		
Spiral sewn				Yes				Yes			Yes			Yes			Yes	
Loose					Yes							Yes			Yes			Yes
Canton flannel						Yes			Yes									
String	Yes	Yes	Yes															
Compound																		
Black										Yes			Yes			Yes		
Brown				Yes							Yes							
White								Yes				Yes		Yes				
Blue	Yes	Yes	Yes			Yes			Yes						Yes			
Green																	Yes	Yes
Red						Yes			Yes						Yes			

Black	Emery compound, a coarse abrasive material for removal of scratches, pits, paint, rust etc.	Abrasive: Emery.
Brown	Tripoli compound used for general purpose cut and color on most soft metals.	Abrasive: Rotten stone.
White	Blizzard compound, used for color and final finish of harder metals, has a cutting action.	Abrasive: white aluminium oxide.
Blue	A dryer, almost greaseless wheel - designed to polish without any cutting action. Safe on thin plates. Use on its own wheel	
Green	Used exclusively for stainless steel	Abrasive: green chromium(III) oxide
Red	Jeweller’s Rouge, designed to polish without any cutting action. Safe on thin plates. Use on its own wheel.	Abrasive: Iron(III) oxide

== Applications ==
Polishing may be used to enhance and restore the looks of certain metal parts or object on cars and other vehicles, handrails, cookware, kitchenware, and architectural metal. In other applications such as pharmaceutical, dairy, and specialty plumbing, pipes are buffed to help prevent corrosion and to eliminate locations where bacteria or mold may reside. Buffing is also used to manufacture light reflectors.

== Silver polish ==
Thiourea has an affinity for certain heavy metal ions, forming soluble coordination complexes. One practical consequence of its affinity for metals, thiourea is a component of silver polish. According to the label on consumer products TarnX and Silver Dip, the liquid silver cleaning products contain thiourea along with a warning that thiourea is a chemical on California's list of carcinogens.

== See also ==
- Abrasive flow machining
- Electropolishing
- Knife sharpening
- Surface finishing

=== Bibliography ===
- Oberg, Erik; Jones, Franklin D.; Horton, Holbrook L.; Ryffel, Henry H. (2000), Machinery's Handbook (26th ed.), New York: Industrial Press Inc., ISBN 0-8311-2635-3.
