= Linishing =

Metalworking process

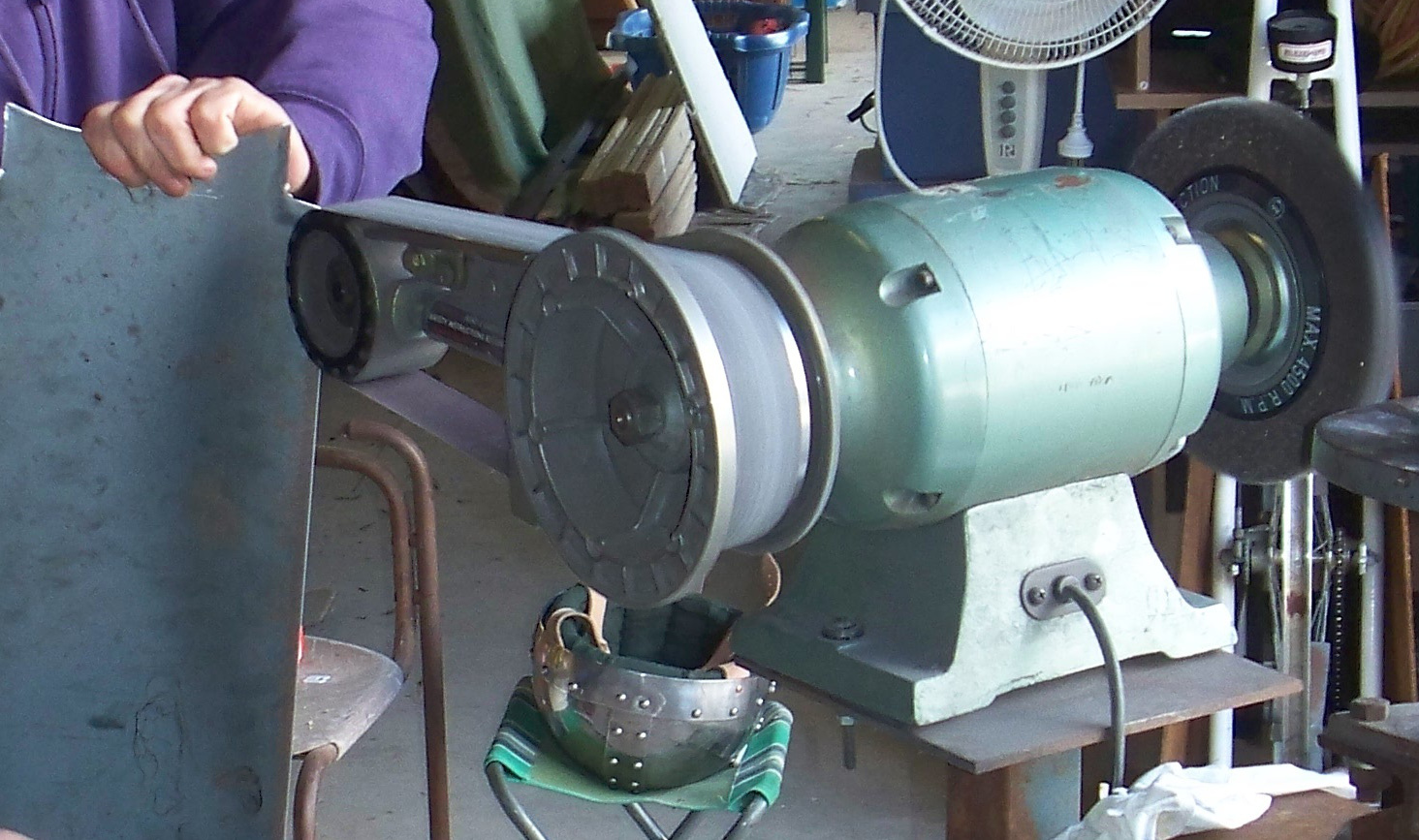
A linishing machine in use

Linishing is the process of using grinding or belt sanding techniques to improve the flatness, smoothness and uniformity of a surface and its finish. The process takes multiple stages, and a finer abrasive surface is typically used each time. Abrasive brushes and linishing belts are typically used, the latter being a machine similar to a belt sander used for large surfaces. Large linishing belts are used in large-scale industrial linishing processes. Hand tools similar to linishing belts but much smaller and more suitable for small surfaces are also used.
