= Fire hardening =

Process of removing moisture from wood

Fire hardening is the process of removing moisture from wood, changing its structure and material properties, by charring it over or directly in a fire or a bed of coals. This has been thought to make a point, like that of a spear or arrow, or an edge, like that of a knife or axe, more durable and efficient for its use as a tool or weapon. An initial study suggests that the process might reduce the work of fracture of the wood by 36% but would substantially reduce the time needed to make a spear point.

Fire hardening may be done before, after, or during the manufacturing of the wooden tip. Longer procedures involving greasing and polishing with stones to impregnate the wood with fats and oils and silica may improve the effects of the process. Fire hardening was first developed by primitive humans at least 400,000 years ago, which was long before either flint or stone points were being made.

== In Prehistory ==
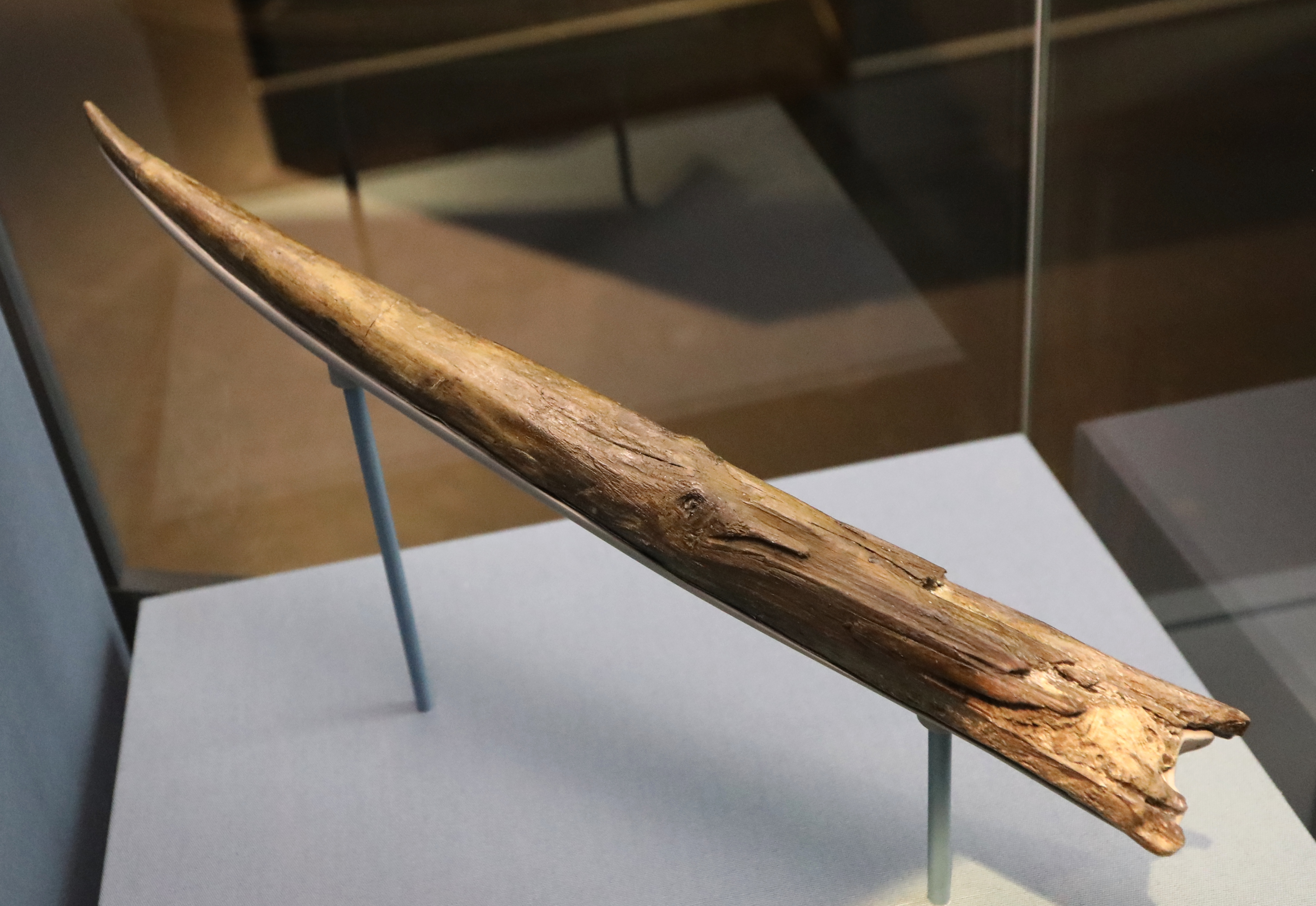
The Clacton Spear in 2018.

It has been suggested that the Clacton Spear may have broken off due to fire hardening which would have significantly increased its work of fracture.

== See also ==
- Wood working
- Flame polishing
