= Electropolishing =

Electrochemical process

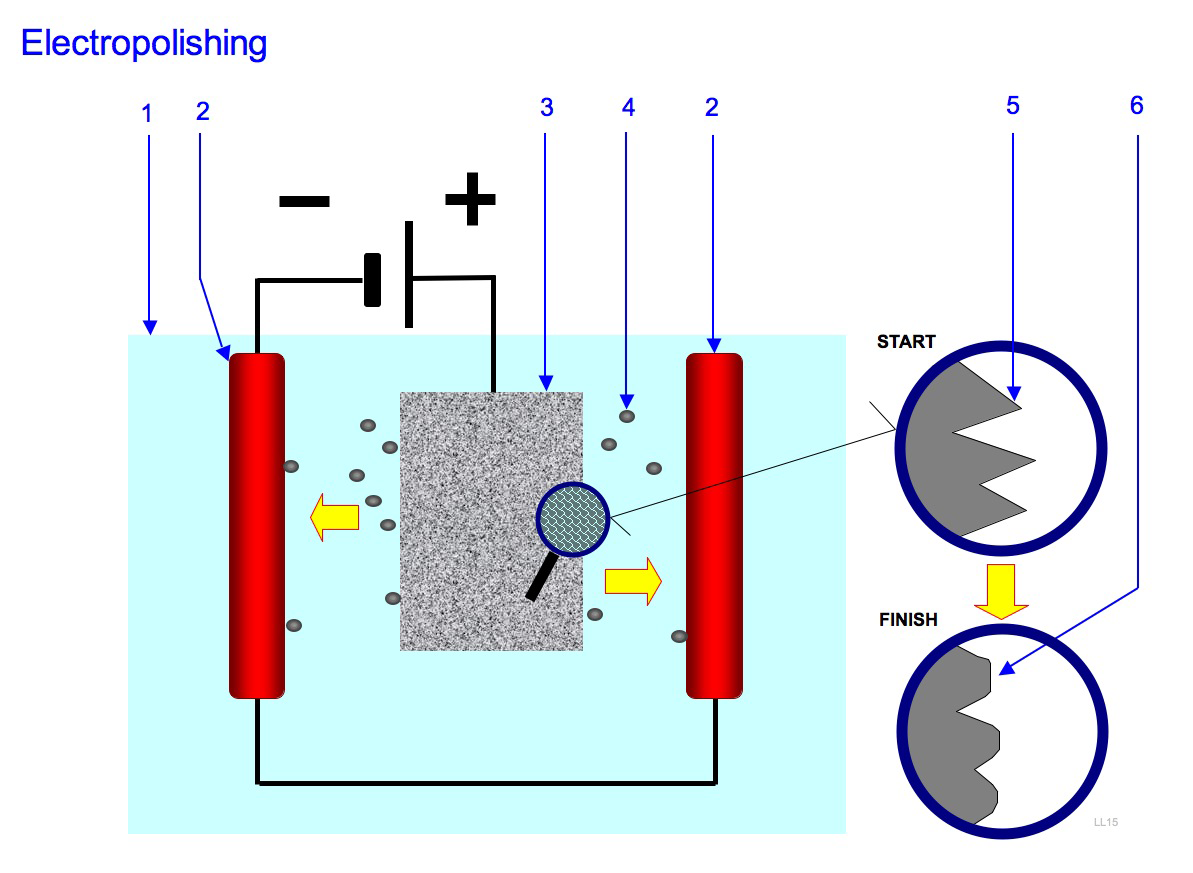
Electropolishing principle: 1. Electrolyte 2. Cathode 3. Workpiece to polish (Anode) 4. Particle moving from the work-piece to the cathode 5. Surface before polishing 6. Surface after polishing

Electropolishing, also known as electrochemical polishing, anodic polishing, or electrolytic polishing (especially in the metallography field), is an electrochemical process that removes material from a metallic workpiece, reducing the surface roughness by levelling micro-peaks and valleys, improving the surface finish. Electropolishing is often compared to, but distinctly different from, electrochemical machining. It is used to polish, passivate, and deburr metal parts. It is often described as the reverse of electroplating.

It may be used in lieu of abrasive fine polishing in microstructural preparation.

== Mechanism ==
Typically, the workpiece is immersed in a temperature-controlled bath of electrolyte and serves as the anode. At the cathode, a reduction reaction occurs, which normally produces hydrogen. The tiny hydrogen bubbles forming on the surface of the workpiece exert a scrubbing action which can be used to clean and polish the part. Electrolytes used for electropolishing are most often concentrated acid solutions such as mixtures of sulfuric acid and phosphoric acid. Other electropolishing electrolytes reported in the literature include mixtures of perchloric acid with acetic anhydride (which has caused fatal explosions), and methanolic solutions of sulfuric acid.

To electropolish a rough surface, the protruding parts of a surface profile must dissolve faster than the recesses. This process, referred to as anodic leveling, can be subject to incorrect analysis when measuring the surface topography. Anodic dissolution under electropolishing conditions deburrs metal objects due to increased current density on corners and burrs. Most importantly, successful electropolishing should operate under diffusion limited constant current plateau, achieved by following current dependence on voltage (polarisation curve), under constant temperature and stirring conditions.

== Benefits ==
- The results are aesthetically pleasing.
- Creates a clean, smooth surface that is easier to sterilise.
- Can polish areas that are inaccessible by other polishing methods.
- Removes a small amount of material (typically 20-40 micrometre in depth in the case of stainless steel) from the surface of the parts, while also removing small burrs or high spots. It can be used to reduce the size of parts when necessary.
- Stainless steel preferentially removes iron from the surface and enhances the chromium/nickel content for the most superior form of passivation for stainless steel.
- Electropolishing can be used on a wide range of metals including stainless steel, aluminum, copper, brass and titanium.

== Applications ==
Due to its ease of operation and its usefulness in polishing irregularly-shaped objects, electropolishing has become a common process in the production of semiconductors.

As electropolishing can also be used to sterilize workpieces, the process plays an essential role in the food, medical, and pharmaceutical industries.

It is commonly used in the post-production of large metal pieces such as those used in drums of washing machines, bodies of ocean vessels and aircraft, and automobiles.

While nearly any metal may be electropolished, the most-commonly polished metals are 300- and 400-series stainless steel, aluminum, copper, titanium, and nickel- and copper-alloys.

Ultra-high vacuum (UHV) components are typically electropolished in order to have a smoother surface for improved vacuum pressures, out-gassing rates, and pumping speed.

Electropolishing is commonly used to prepare thin metal samples for transmission electron microscopy and atom probe tomography because the process does not mechanically deform surface layers like mechanical polishing does.

== Standards ==
- ISO.15730:2000 Metallic and other Inorganic Coatings - Electropolishing as a Means of Smoothing and Passivating Stainless Steel
- ASME BPE Standards for Electropolishing Bioprocessing Equipment
- SEMI F19, Electropolishing Specifications for Semiconductor Applications
- ASTM B 912-02 (2008), Passivation of Stainless Steels Using Electropolishing
- ASTM E1558, Standard Guide for Electrolytic Polishing of Metallographic Specimens

== See also ==
- Corrosion – Gradual destruction of materials by chemical reaction with its environment
- Electroetching
- Passivation (chemistry) – Physico-chemical processes contributing to protect a surface against oxidation
- Polishing (metalworking) – Abrasive process for creating smooth finished surfaces
- Stainless steel – Steel alloy resistant to corrosion
