= Burr (edge) =

Piece of material left on a workpiece after some operation

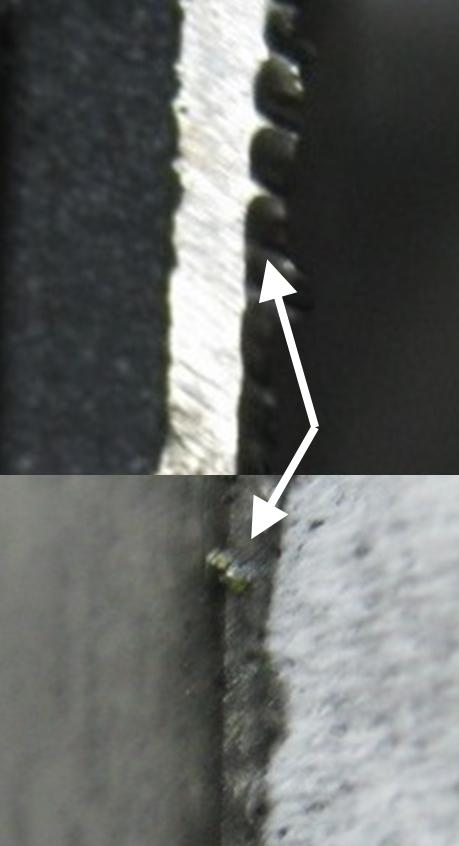
Metal burr extending beyond the edge of the cut piece, view on the cut face (top) and from the bottom (bottom)

A burr is a raised edge or small piece of material that remains attached to a workpiece after a modification process. It is usually an unwanted piece of material and is removed with a deburring tool in a process called deburring. Burrs are most commonly created by machining operations, such as grinding, drilling, milling, engraving or turning. It may be present in the form of a fine wire on the edge of a freshly sharpened tool or as a raised portion of a surface; this type of burr is commonly formed when a hammer strikes a surface. Deburring accounts for a significant portion of manufacturing costs.

In the printmaking technique of drypoint, burr, which gives a rich fuzzy quality to the engraved line, is highly desirable—the great problem with the drypoint medium is that the burr rapidly diminishes after as few as ten impressions are printed.

== Types ==
There are three types of burrs that can be formed from machining operations: Poisson burr, rollover burr, and breakout burr. The rollover burr is the most common. Burrs may be classified by the physical manner of formation. Plastic deformation of material includes lateral flow (Poisson burr), bending (rollover burr), and tearing of material from the workpiece (tear burr). Solidification or redeposition of material results in a recast bead. Incomplete cutoff of material causes a cutoff projection.

Burrs can be minimized or prevented by considering materials, function, shape, and processing in the design and manufacturing engineering phases of product development.

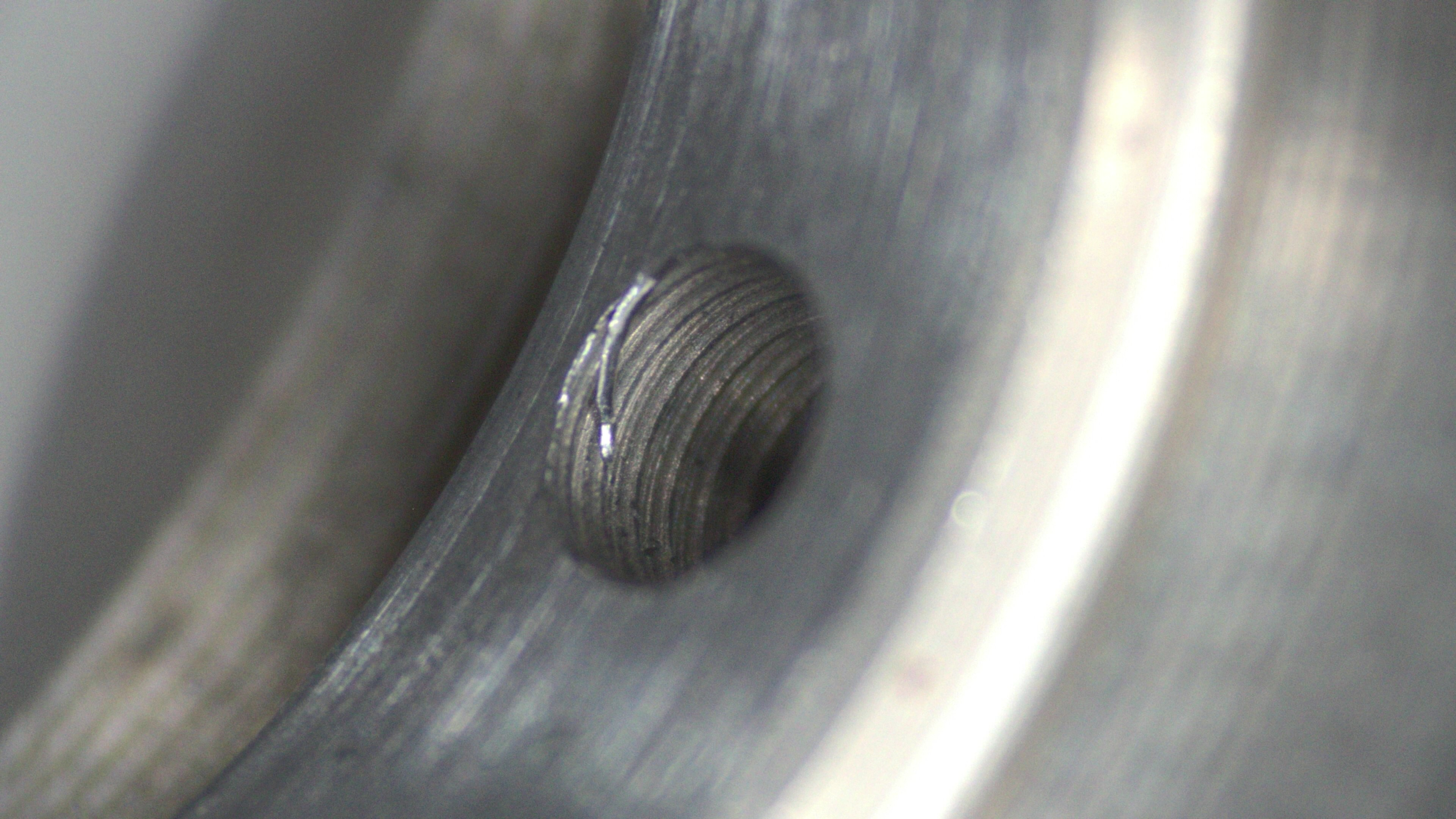
Tapped hole with burr

Burrs in drilled holes cause fastener and material problems. Burrs cause more stress to be concentrated at the edges of holes, decreasing resistance to fracture and shortening fatigue life. They interfere with the seating of fasteners, causing damage to fastener or the assembly itself. Cracks caused by stress and strain can result in material failure. Burrs in holes also increase the risk of corrosion, which may be due to variations in the thickness of coatings on a rougher surface. Sharp corners tend to concentrate electrical charge, increasing the risk of static discharge. Burrs in moving parts increase unwanted friction and heat. Rough surfaces also result in problems with lubrication, as wear is increased at the interfaces of parts. This makes it necessary to replace them more frequently. Electrical charge buildup can cause corrosion.

== Deburring ==
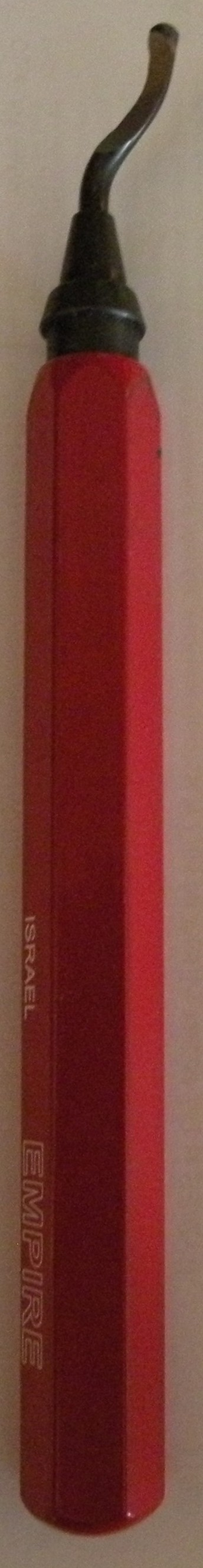
A manual deburring tool

There are many deburring processes, but the most common are mass-finishing, spindle finishing, media blasting, sanding, grinding, wire brushing, abrasive flow machining, electrochemical deburring, electropolishing, thermal energy method, machining, water jet deburring, and manual deburring.

=== Manual ===
Manual deburring is the most common deburring process because it is the most flexible process. It also only requires low cost tools and allows for instant inspection. Manual deburring is either done with tools like scrapers, files, sandpaper, stones and reamers or with handheld power tools that use abrasive points, sandpaper, or cutters similar to those used to deburr during machining.

=== Electrochemical ===
Electrochemical deburring is the use of electrochemical machining to deburr precision work pieces and edges that are hard-to-reach, such as intersecting holes. The process uses a salt or glycol solution and electricity to dissolve the burr. The electric current is applied with a specialized tool to reach the burr location. Burrs are removed in 5 to 10 seconds, while the rest of the work piece is unaffected.

=== Thermal ===
Thermal energy method (TEM), also known as thermal deburring, is a deburring process used to remove hard-to-reach burrs or burrs from multiple surfaces at the same time. The process uses an explosive gas mixture to provide thermal energy to burn off the burrs. It is the fastest burr removal process, requiring only 20 milliseconds to remove a burr.

The process starts by loading the workpiece into an explosion-proof chamber, which is then sealed and clamped with approximately 220 metric tons (240 short tons). The chamber is then evacuated of air and filled with an oxygen and fuel mix; this mixture is pressurized to 0.5 to 1.9 MPa (73 to 276 psi). An electrical igniter then ignites the mixture, which burns for approximately 20 milliseconds, causing all of the sharp corners and burrs to burn away. The peak temperature reaches 3,000 °C (5,430 °F).

=== Cryogenic ===
Cryogenic deburring is a cryogenic process used to remove burrs and flash from plastic and die cast workpieces. The process works by tumbling and/or abrasively blasting the workpieces at cryogenic temperature levels. The low temperatures (approximately −195 °C (−319.0 °F)) are achieved using liquid nitrogen, liquid carbon dioxide, or dry ice. This low temperature brings the material below its embrittlement temperature, which causes the flash or burrs to be easily removed via tumbling or media blasting. This process has been around since the 1960s to deflash plastic and rubber.

=== Mechanical ===
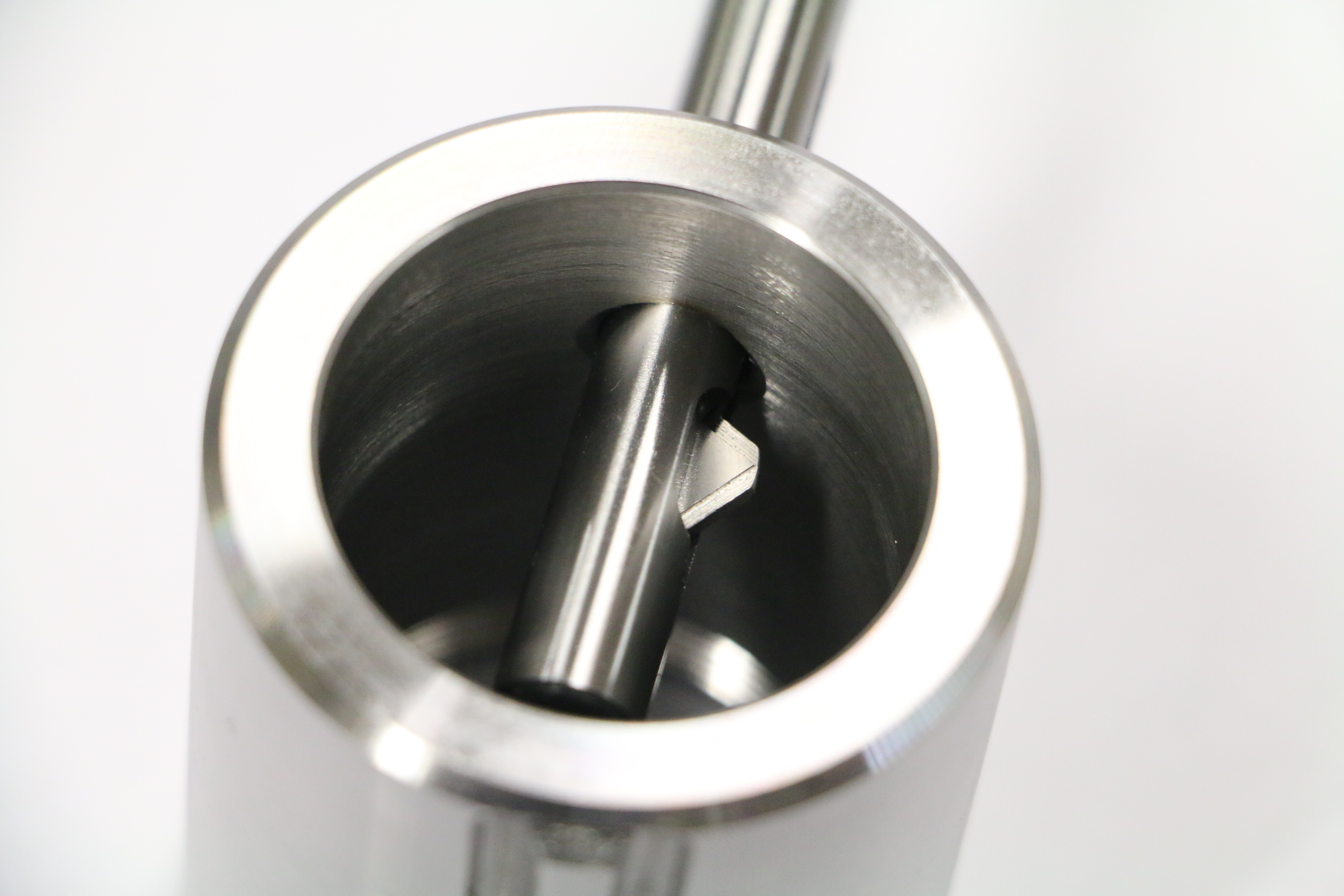
A typical example of a 'Burraway' tool, deburring the back of a hole.

Mechanical deburring is a deburring process that either mechanically grinds a burr off of metal or rolls the edge of the dangerous slit or sheared metal burrs into itself. Rolled mechanical deburring was first developed in the 1960s as a means to speed up the process of hand deburring strips of metal that were used in bakery racks.

=== Water jet ===
One of the main benefits of waterjet deburring is a high level of precision and repeatability - and for this reason, CNC control is used. This eco-friendly process uses high-pressure water to remove loose burrs and chips even in deep holes – all while leaving the parts cleaner and free of debris. Pressurized water is precisely focused via CNC control to remove burrs and chips in and around parts. Depending on the cleanliness specifications, this can be performed submerged or in an open-air environment. Open-air washing/deburring targets specific areas of the part where the water jet is focused. Submerged will clean the entire part, internally and externally.

=== Ultrasonic Deburring ===
Powerful ultrasonic waves are irradiated against the tank containing the liquid. This technology removes burrs by the pressure generated within the liquid as cavities are generated and dissipated.

== See also ==
- Swarf
- Fillet and chamfer, edge features designed to reduce burrs.
