= Vapor polishing =

Vapor polishing is a method of polishing plastics to reduce the surface roughness or improve clarity. Typically, a component is exposed to a chemical vapor, causing the surface to flow, thereby improving the surface finish. This method of polishing is frequently used to return clear materials to an optical-quality finish after machining. Vapor polishing works well in the internal features of components.

Feature size changes of the plastic component generally do not occur. Post-stress relieving is usually required, as vapor polishing sets up surface stresses that can cause crazing.

Plastics that respond well to vapor polishing are polycarbonate, acrylic, polysulfone, PEI, and ABS.

The technique is also being used to improve the surface of objects created with 3D printing techniques. As the printer deposits layer upon layer of material to build the object, the surface is often not entirely smooth. The smoothness of the surface can be greatly increased by vapor polishing.
