= Abrasive flow machining =

Interior surface finishing process

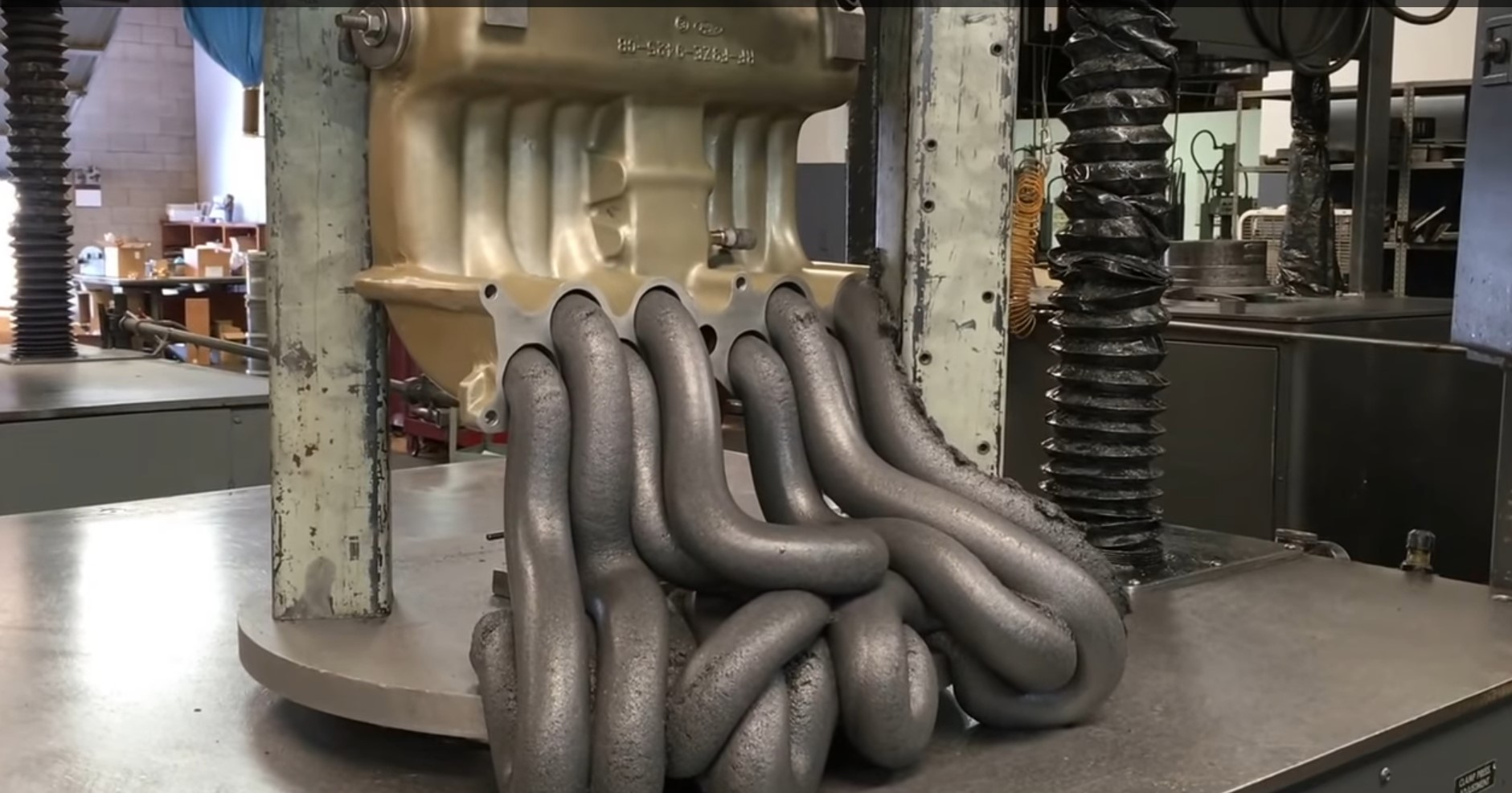

Abrasive flow machining (AFM), also known as abrasive flow deburring or extrude honing, is an interior surface finishing process characterized by flowing an abrasive-laden fluid through a workpiece. This fluid is typically very viscous, having the consistency of putty, or dough. AFM smooths and finishes rough surfaces, and is specifically used to remove burrs, polish surfaces, form radii, and even remove material. The nature of AFM makes it ideal for interior surfaces, slots, holes, cavities, and other areas that may be difficult to reach with other polishing or grinding processes. Due to its low material removal rate, AFM is not typically used for large stock-removal operations, although it can be.

Abrasive flow machining was first patented by the Extrude Hone Corporation in 1970.

== Process ==
In abrasive flow machining, the abrasive fluid flows through the workpiece, effectively performing erosion. Abrasive particles in the fluid contact raised features on the surface of the workpiece and remove them. The fluid is forced through the workpiece by a hydraulic ram, where it acts as a flexible file, or slug, molding itself precisely to the shape of the workpiece. The highest amount of material removal occurs in areas where the flow of the fluid is restricted; according to Bernoulli's Principle, the flow speed and pressure of the fluid decrease in these areas, facilitating a higher material removal rate (MRR). The pressure exerted by the fluid on all contacting surfaces also results in a very uniform finish.

AFM may be performed once, as a one-way flow process, or repeatedly as a two-way flow process. In the two-way flow process, a reservoir of medium exists at either end of the workpiece, and the medium flows back and forth through the workpiece from reservoir to reservoir.

== Equipment ==
An abrasive flow machine normally includes two medium chambers equipped with hydraulic rams, a fixture for holding the workpiece, and a clamping system that holds all the components tightly together. Most machines allow for the loading of different types of abrasive medium, and include the capacity to adjust the pressure used in extruding the medium through the workpiece. They may be manually operated, or automated using CNC. For machines designed to accommodate high production volumes, accessories such as part-cleaning stations, unloading and reloading stations, media refeed devices, and media heat exchangers may be included.

== See also ==
- Hydro-erosive grinding
