= Magnetic field-assisted finishing =

Magnetic field-assisted finishing, sometimes called magnetic abrasive finishing, is a surface finishing technique in which a magnetic field is used to force abrasive particles against the target surface. As such, finishing of conventionally inaccessible surfaces (e.g., the inside surface of a long curved pipe) is possible. Magnetic field-assisted finishing (MAF) processes have been developed for a wide variety of applications including the manufacturing of medical components, fluid systems, optics, dies and molds, electronic components, microelectromechanical systems, and mechanical components.

== History ==
MAF was initially developed as a machining process in the US in the 1930s, with the first patent in the 1940s. University research in the Soviet Union, Bulgaria, Germany, Poland, and US began in the 1960s with practical usage appearing by the 1980s and 1990s. The growth of the semiconductor, aerospace, and optics industries have resulted in the continued development of better methods for attaining high form accuracy and surface integrity.

== Theory ==
Magnetic Assisted Finishing or "MAF" is essentially the manipulation of a homogeneous mixture of magnetic particles and abrasive particles with a magnetic field to impart a machining force on a workpiece. Relative motion between the particle mixture and the workpiece surface result in material removal. Since MAF does not require direct contact with the tool, the particles can be introduced into areas which are hard to reach by conventional techniques. Additionally careful selection of magnetic particles and abrasive particles give rise to surface texture and roughness control that was previously impossible especially for hard to access areas.

== Field sources ==
The magnetic field source in MAF is typically an electromagnet or a rare earth permanent magnet. A permanent magnet offers high energy density, lack of overheating resulting in a constant flux density, low cost, ease of integration into existing CNC equipment, and simplicity. Some applications require adjustment of the flux density during finishing, or require a switching magnetic field, which is only attainable with an electromagnet since the magnetic field in a permanent magnet cannot simply be switched off.

== Equipment ==
Relative motion between the magnetic/abrasive particle mixture and the workpiece is essential for material removal. There are several options for achieving the necessary motion. A common setup is the rotation of the magnetic pole tip. This is done by either rotating the entire permanent magnet setup or by rotating only the steel pole. Another method which is commonly utilized in internal finishing is the rotation of the workpiece, this is unfortunately limited to axial symmetric workpieces. In addition to rotational motion there is oscillatory and vibrational configurations that are applicable.

== Force on a particle ==
Start with the common expression for force on a magnetic dipole moment in a magnetic field,

$$\vec{F} = \nabla(\vec{m}\cdot\vec{B})$$

From here, make the assumption that the moment of the magnetic particle is co-linear with the applied field. This is a reasonable assumption given the small size and high susceptibility of the magnetic particles. So the equation becomes,

$$\vec{F} = m\nabla B$$

Using the following identities to obtain a more usable equation to describe the force experienced by a single magnetic particle,

$$m = M V$$

$$M = H_k \chi$$

$$B = \mu_0 H_a$$

Substituting the above definitions into the magnetic force equation yields,

$\vec{F} = \mu_0 \chi V H_k \nabla H_a$

where,

- $H_k$ is the maximum applied field for saturation of the magnetic particle
- $H_a$ is the applied magnetic field intensity
- $B$ is the magnetic flux density
- $M$ is the magnetization of the particle, assumed to be saturated
- $m$ is the magnetic dipole moment
- $\nabla H$ is the magnetic field gradient
- $V$ is the volume of the particle (assuming sphere shaped)
- $\chi$ is the material magnetic susceptibility
- $\mu_0$ is the permeability of free space

== Brush ==
=== Brush composition ===
==== Magnetic materials ====
Iron and its oxides
Cobalt
Nickel
Steel and Stainless steel

==== Abrasives ====
Synthetic diamond
Cubic boron nitride CBN
Aluminum oxide Al_2O_3
Silicon carbide SiC

==== Common Magnetic Abrasive Materials ====
White Alumina + Iron
Diamond + Iron
Tungsten Carbide + cobalt

=== Brush formation ===
It is theorized that the formation of the brush is governed by three driving energies. The first energy Wm is the magnetization energy between particles which result in the formation of magnetic chains of particles. The next energy is known as Repulsion energy Wf this is the separation of adjacent chains of material particles driven by the Faraday effect, this is the reason why the chains do not immediately mix into one giant chain. Finally the third energy is called the Tension energy Wt, this refers to the energy required to counteract the curved magnetic chains.

Therefore the energy required to form the magnetic brush is as follows:

$$W=W_m+W_f+W_t$$

=== Forces applied by brush ===
The force applied to the surface by a magnetic particle in the magnetic brush can be divided into two components. The normal force and the tangential force.

The normal force at the surface applied by a magnetic particle can be defined as a function of area S and magnetic field B in the following expression:[3]

$$F_n=mf_n=\frac{B^2}{2\mu_0}\left (1-\frac{1}{\mu_m} \right )S$$

Where the permeability of the magnetic particles is defined by a volume fraction of iron particles defined as:

$$\mu_m = \frac{2+\mu_F-2(1-\mu_F)Vi}{2+\mu_F-(1-\mu_F)Vi}$$

Where

$f_n =$normal force per particle
$m =$number of particles particle
$B =$Magnetic B Field
$S =$Area Factor S
$\mu_0 =$permeability of air
$\mu_m =$permeability of magnetic particles
$\mu_f =$permeability of ferrous particles

The tangential force of the brush can be defined as a change in energy of the brush due to an obstruction. Since the magnetic particle prefer to be in the lowest energy state, an increase in energy due to deviation from the magnetic flux lines can result in a horizontal "restoring" force which is acted on the surface of the workpiece. This restoring force can be defined as:

$$F_H=\frac {dW}{dx}$$

== Material removal ==
The combination of tangential force and normal forces exerted by the brush onto the workpiece is theorized to remove material from the top peaks of the surface asperities. This process is repeated as the contact between the brush and the surface continues during the finishing operation. Over time the surface roughness of the workpiece surface reaches a minimum value, this is due to the physical limitations of the current finishing setup. Specifically the selection of iron particles and abrasive particles dictates the minimum surface roughness that can be achieved. As the surface roughness decreases smaller abrasive particles are necessary to continue material removal.

MAF is capable of achieving roughness values ranging from 200 μm Ra down to 1 nm Ra with ease, demonstrating the degree of customization available to a MAF setup. The particle sizes for the magnetic particles in the brush dictate the finishing force which is governed by the magnetic force on a particle equation. however increasing particle size has adverse effects such as the inability to hold small abrasives and the presence of air gaps as a result of a larger packing factor. In order to alleviate these problems it is common practice to mix the magnetic particles with both large and smaller particles to "fill" the "holes" of the brush, the small particles effectively coat the larger particles within the particle chain. Close control of the surface texture and roughness can be manipulated through the selection of the right abrasive size and oscillation speed and spindle rpm. Generally speaking the faster the motion of the brush the more dense the finishing marks on the surface and the higher the surface roughness.

== Types ==
MAF can be divided into three main categories, each defined by the type of magnetic particles utilized in the finishing operation. Each type has its specific niche that it may fulfill better than its counterparts therefore knowing the application of the process is key to selecting the proper finishing operation. The different MAF processes are listed in increasing surface roughness resolution while decreasing in applied force. This is primarily due to the reduction in iron particle size from one type of finishing to the next. These processes are just general terms and examples for some MAF setups; each of these processes has different variations that increase their applicability to other workpieces.

=== Magnetic abrasive finishing ===
Magnetic Abrasive Finishing refers to using 1 μm - 2 mm iron particles mixed with an abrasive to apply the machining force through manipulation of the particles with a magnetic field. The magnetic particle and abrasive mixture is commonly referred to the "magnetic brush" because it appears and behaves similar to a wire brush. Unlike a conventional brush the magnetic chains of particles are flexible and will conform around any geometry. As the displacement of the brush increases beyond the flexibility of the bush the magnetic bristles are able to break and reform further increasing the flexibility and versatility of this finishing process. Therefore, this specific variety of MAF is aimed towards finishing of the free form external surfaces such as airfoils or prosthesis. However it can also easily be applicable to internal finishing processes and is especially effective at finishing the internal surfaces of workpieces that are difficult to access otherwise such as capillary tubes and other small gauge needles. The main difference between internal and external finishing operations is the location of the brush and the workpiece however the application of force is essentially the same hence the material removal mechanism is identical in both cases. One key parameter that the user needs to be aware of is the proper completion of the magnetic circuit to ensure the magnetic flux uniformly permeates through the workpiece at the desired finishing location. The addition of an oil based lubricant, the magnetic brush can also be considered a magnetorheological fluid.

==== Applications ====
Freeform finishing
Prosthetics
Cutting Tools
Turbine Blades
Airfoils
Optics
Internal Finishing
Sanitary Pipes
Food Industry
Capillary Tubes in Medical Field

Stents, Catheter shafts, Needles, Biopsy Needles, etc

Curved Pipes

=== Magnetorheological finishing ===
Magnetorheological finishing or "MRF" uses the shearing of a viscous mixture of micron sized iron particles, abrasives, and oil to impart a machining force or pressure onto the workpiece surface. This magnetic particle mixture is commonly referred to a ribbon and is extremely viscous in the presence of a magnetic field, the increased viscosity and different fluid properties are similar to those of a Bingham fluid rather than a Newtonian fluid. In a typical MRF finishing setup the MRF fluid is pumped onto a rotating wheel which is connected to an electromagnet. When the electromagnet is activated the fluid transitions to a more viscous state, the workpiece is then pressed onto the fluid resulting a shearing of the fluid which results in material removal at the interface between the workpiece and the MRF. One of the characteristics of a Bingham fluid is as speed increases the force required to shear proportionally increases therefore an increased wheel rotational rate results in an increased machining force when sheared. This particular setup is ideal for large free form nonmagnetic workpieces such as glass optics. It is also commonly applied to large nonmagnetic workpieces where the thickness of the work results in difficulty in getting the magnetic field to permeate effectively at the desired location hence this setup does not rely on the careful design of the magnetic circuit.

==== Applications ====
Sub-nanometer scale polishing

Freeform nonmagnetic workpieces
Optics
Ceramics

=== Magnetic fluid finishing ===
In magnetic fluid finishing a solution of ferrofluid and abrasive particles are used as the magnetic particle mixture. Typically this is applicable for applications where even the other types of MAF are unable to access or when a less viscous medium is desired. One example application of magnetic fluid finishing is silicon micropore optics, in the case of this particular optic the side walls are to be finished to <1.0 nm rms for x-ray reflection. The pores are 5μmx20μmx300μm which makes it virtually impossible to access with any conventional technique. The magnetic particle and abrasive solution is placed in an alternating and switching magnetic field to encourage fluid flow from one side of the optic to the other side. This flow results in material removal of the sidewalls through the momentum of the fluid and shearing of the side walls with the abrasives. Another application is in the finishing of ceramic bearing balls. This is also known as magnetic float polishing and employs a magnetic fluid with a magnetic "float" to ensure an even pressure distribution on the sphere surface during rotation. This results in a uniform application of finishing force onto the workpiece surface.

==== Applications ====
Bearings and Rollers
High Precision Optics

== Capabilities ==
- Able to attain wide range of surface characteristics by careful selection of magnetic particles and abrasive particles
  - Roughness values from 200 um - 1 nm
  - Texturing
    - Enhance surface characteristics such as wettability or reducing friction
- Capable to accessing hard to reach areas
- Capable of modifying roughness without altering form
- Setup is independent of workpiece material
  - Can efficiently finish ceramics, stainless steels, carbides, coated carbides, and silicon
  - Flexible application of force and even pressure distribution reduce cost of assembly
    - Vibrations in the machining center and machining tool are not transmitted onto the workpiece surface

== Limitations ==
- Can be difficult to scale up to mass production operation
- Not as applicable to some "ordinary" finishing tasks where conventional finishing techniques can be used
