= Superfinishing =

Workpiece finishing process

Superfinishing, also known as microfinishing and short-stroke honing, is a metalworking process that improves surface finish and workpiece geometry. This is achieved by removing just the thin amorphous surface layer of fragmented or smeared metal left by the last process with an abrasive stone or tape; this layer is usually about 1 μm in magnitude.

== Process ==
After a metal piece is ground to an initial finish, it is superfinished with a finer-grit abrasive stone. The stone is oscillated or rotated while the workpiece is moved in such a way that each bonded grain of abrasive follows an effectively random path with variations in speed, direction, and pressure. This multi-motion is a key feature of superfinishing because it prevents the sort of smeared finish that results from a built-up edge. In this way, superfinishing is similar to lapping, but with a bonded-abrasive stone rather than loose or embedded abrasive. The geometry of the abrasive depends on the geometry of the workpiece surface; a stone (rectangular shape) is for cylindrical surfaces, and cups and wheels are used for flat and spherical surfaces. A lubricant is used to minimize heat production, which can alter the metallurgical properties, and to carry away the swarf; kerosene is a common lubricant.

The abrasive cuts the surface of the workpiece in three phases. The first phase is when the abrasive first contacts the workpiece surface: dull grains of the abrasive fracture and fall away leaving a new sharp cutting surface. In the second phase, the abrasive "self-dresses" while most of the stock is being removed. Finally, the abrasive grains become dull as they work, which improves the surface geometry.

Superfinishing differs from grinding in that the relative speed between the abrasive and workpiece is kept low enough to avoid heating, and the pressure is light. Superfinishing differs from long-stroke honing in that a controlled-viscosity lubricant is used so that an oil wedge forms that automatically terminates cutting at a predetermined cutting pressure. Superfinishing is unique in involving rapid changes in the speed, direction, and pressure on each grain of abrasive in the abrasive stone. This "multi-motion" is critical to achieving the finest-possible finish because it prevents re-formation of an amorphous layer of smear metal due to a built-up edge.

Superfinishing can give a surface finish of 0.01 μm.

=== Types ===
There are three types superfinishing: through-feed, plunge, and wheels.

Through-feed
This type of superfinishing is used for cylindrical workpieces. The workpiece is rotated between two drive rollers, which also move the machine as well. Four to eight progressively finer abrasive stones are used to superfinish the workpiece. The stones contact the workpiece at a 90° angle and are oscillated axially. Examples of parts that would be produced by process include tapered rolls, piston pins, shock absorber rods, shafts, and needles.

Plunge
This type is used to finish irregularly shaped surfaces. The workpiece is rotated while the abrasive plunges onto the desired surface.

Wheels
Abrasive cups or wheels are used to superfinish flat and spherical surfaces. The wheel and workpiece are rotated in opposite directions, which creates the cross-hatching. If the two are parallel, then the result if a flat finish, but if the wheel is tilted slightly, then a convex or concave surface will form.

=== Abrasives ===
Common abrasives used for superfinishing include aluminum oxide, silicon carbide, cubic boron nitride (CBN), and diamond.

Aluminum oxide is used for "roughing" operations. Silicon carbide, which is harder than aluminum oxide, is used for "finishing" operations. CBN and diamond are not as commonly used, but find use with specialized materials such as ceramics and M50 tool steel. Note that graphite may be mixed with other abrasives to add lubricity and to enhance the appearance of the finish.

Abrasive grains must be very fine to be used with superfinishing, usually 5–8 μm.

== Applications ==
Common applications include steering rack components, transmission components, fuel injector components, camshaft lobes, hydraulic cylinder rods, bearing races, needle rollers, and sharpening stones and wheels.

It has been proven that superfinishing certain parts makes them more durable. For example, if the teeth in a gear are superfinished, then they will last up to four times longer.

== History ==
Superfinishing was conceived of by the Chrysler Corporation in 1934 in response to widespread damage sustained by wheel bearings installed in automobiles shipped by rail from Detroit to California. The problem manifested as a buzzing or clicking sound that annoyed buyers of new cars and trucks, but the cause was unclear and so car dealerships in the Western United States eventually resorted to replacing all factory-installed wheel bearings with virgin bearings prior to sale.

Brinelling of the bearing races was eventually identified as the cause of the noise, but a way to prevent this damage proved elusive. Thousands of design and process variations were tried in attempting to prevent brinelling, but none had any effect. A batch of bearings that had been brinelled was reworked by removing the brinell marks by hand with fine sandpaper, and these reworked bearings were installed in automobiles that were loaded onto a train and shipped from Detroit to California as an experiment. A tool maker traveled on the same train and then inspected the bearings when they arrived in California. He found the bearings to be damage-free, making this the first method to have any effect on the problem.

The hand-finishing method of removing amorphous "grinding fuzz" from crystalline base metal using sandpaper was then mechanized for low-rate production. Small grinding stones in a flexible rubber holder were driven by a manually operated drill press to remove grinding fuzz from bearing cups. Fully automated superfinishing machines were then developed.

Random motion between the abrasive stone and workpiece was found to be critical to the superfinishing process. Hand lapping and hand sanding naturally involve irregular variations in direction, speed, and pressure, but mechanized metal finishing processes up to the development of superfinishing had not appreciated the importance of "multi-motion."

Investigation showed that multi-motion is important to achieving the best possible finish because it avoids smearing caused by a built-up edge. Multi-motion avoids smearing by continually unloading the cutting edge of a given abrasive grain so that the built-up edge that has formed is interrupted, and never builds to a size sufficient to smear against the workpiece.

== See also ==
- Abrasive machining
- Honing
- Lapping
