= Vibratory finishing =

Type of finishing process for small items

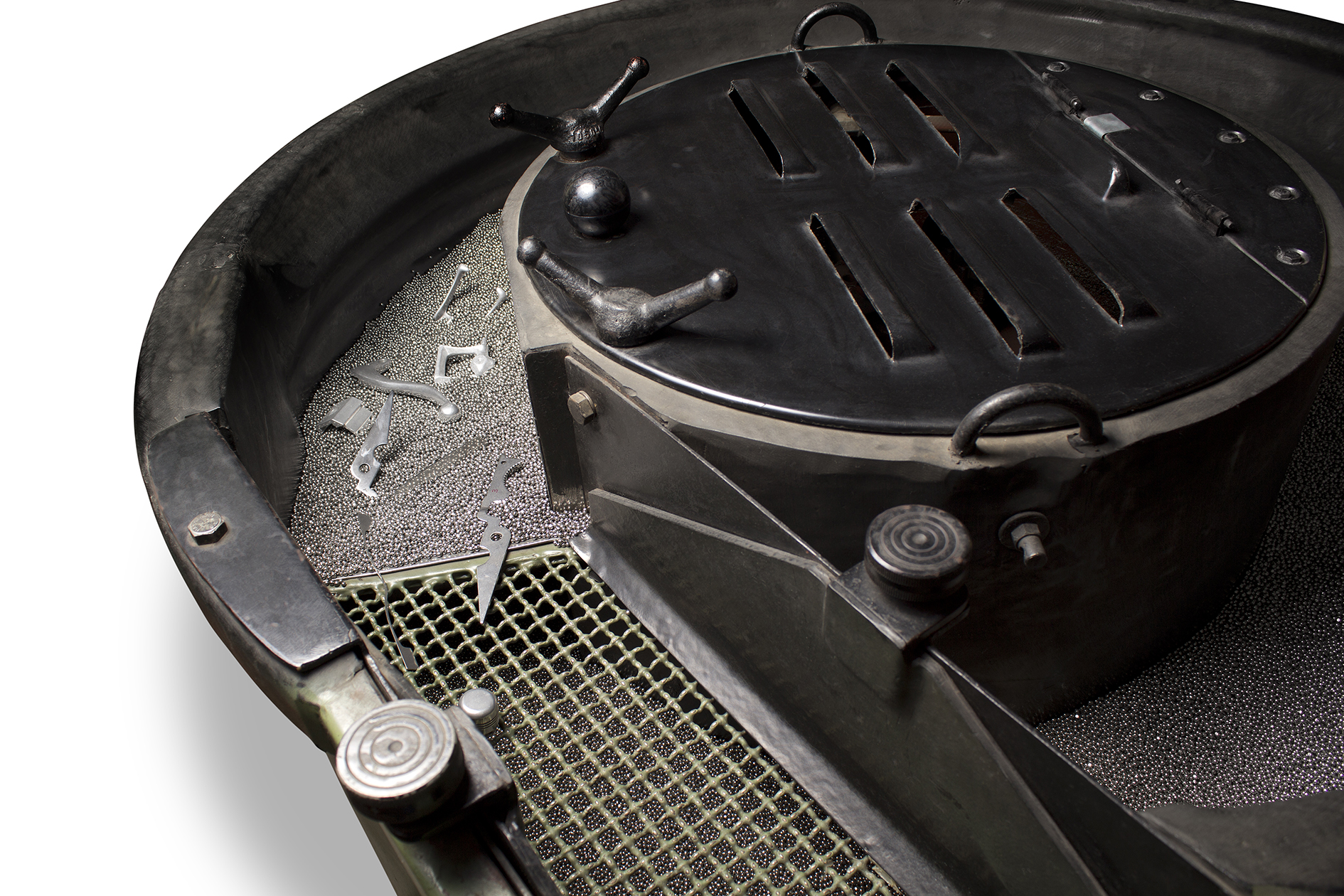
Vibratory tumbler with steel shots polishing small parts

Vibratory finishing is a type of mass finishing manufacturing process used to deburr, radius, descale, burnish, clean, and brighten a large number of relatively small workpieces.

In this batch-type operation, specially shaped pellets of media and the workpieces are placed into the tub of a vibratory tumbler. The tub of the vibratory tumbler and all of its contents are then vibrated. The vibratory action causes the media to rub against the workpieces which yield the desired result. Depending on the application this can be either a dry or wet process.

Unlike rotary tumbling this process can finish internal features, such as holes. It is also quicker and quieter. The process is performed in an open tub so the operator can easily observe if the required finish has been obtained.

== Vibratory tumblers ==
Vibratory tumblers have an action that is similar to filing. An eccentric, rotating weight shakes the tub in a circular path, during which the entire load is lifted up at an angle and then dropped. As the load is falling (but not actually airborne) the tub returns to an upward position, applying an upward and angular force that causes a shearing action where the parts and media rub against each other.

Vibratory finishing systems tend to produce a smooth finish because the media essentially laps the parts. Since the load is moving as a unit, fragile parts are safe in the vibrator. There is no tearing action or unequal forces that tend to bend and distort parts. The larger the parts or media are, the faster the cutting action.

The frequency and amplitude of the machine controls the finish of the parts. The frequencies can vary from 900 to 3600 cycles per minute (CPM) and the amplitude can vary from 0 to 3/16 in (4.76 mm). High frequencies, 1800 CPM or greater, and small amplitudes are used for fine finishes or delicate parts, whereas large amplitudes are used for heavier cutting. High frequencies and amplitudes can roll burrs and peen edges. The circulation of parts is best at higher frequencies, therefore, heavy pieces are run at these high frequencies with moderate amplitudes of 3/32 to 1/8 in (2.38 to 3.18 mm).

Despite the apparent rubbing action of particles against parts, studies show that the primary mechanism of material removal in vibratory finishing is erosion caused by the relatively normal impacts of particles on parts. These impacts occur at the same frequency as the vibration, and at impact velocities of less than 1 m/s.

== Media ==
Any material or substance which is used to give finish or final touch to any part or product is classified as media. Typical media are performed in a rigid molded shape containing a bonding agent. These media work by continual exposure to abrasive particles, as the adhering agent, wears out during the usage of material.

All the tumbling media have some basic functions in common. These are able to provide some support to parts preventing them from mechanical damage, keep parts separate, supply abrasive, improve tumbling action, deburr and also serve as a carrier for the compound.

== Benefits ==
The 9 Benefit of Tumbling Media are:

1. Protect parts to avoid impingements
2. Keeps parts separate from one another
3. Improves tumbling performance
4. Offer abrasive element constantly
5. Cleaning, Polishing, Burnishing
6. Improve parts surface conditions
7. Parts deburring and edge rounding
8. Works on cavities, slots, and recesses
9. Performance as Compound Carrier

== See also ==
- Tumble finishing

== Bibliography ==
- Degarmo, E. Paul; Black, J T.; Kohser, Ronald A. (2003), Materials and Processes in Manufacturing (9th ed.), Wiley, ISBN 978-0-471-65653-1.
