= Mass finishing =

Group of manufacturing processes

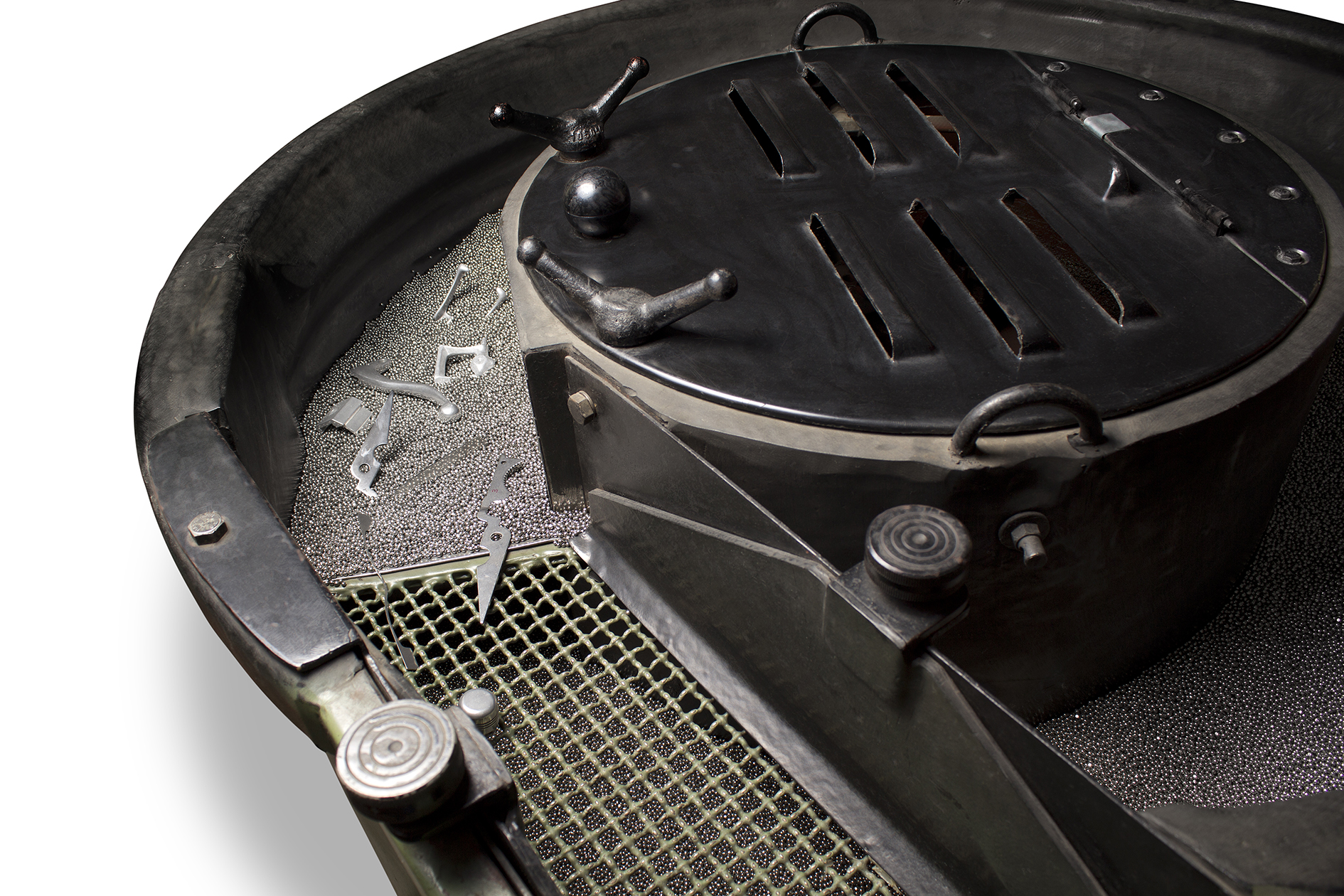
Vibratory tumbler

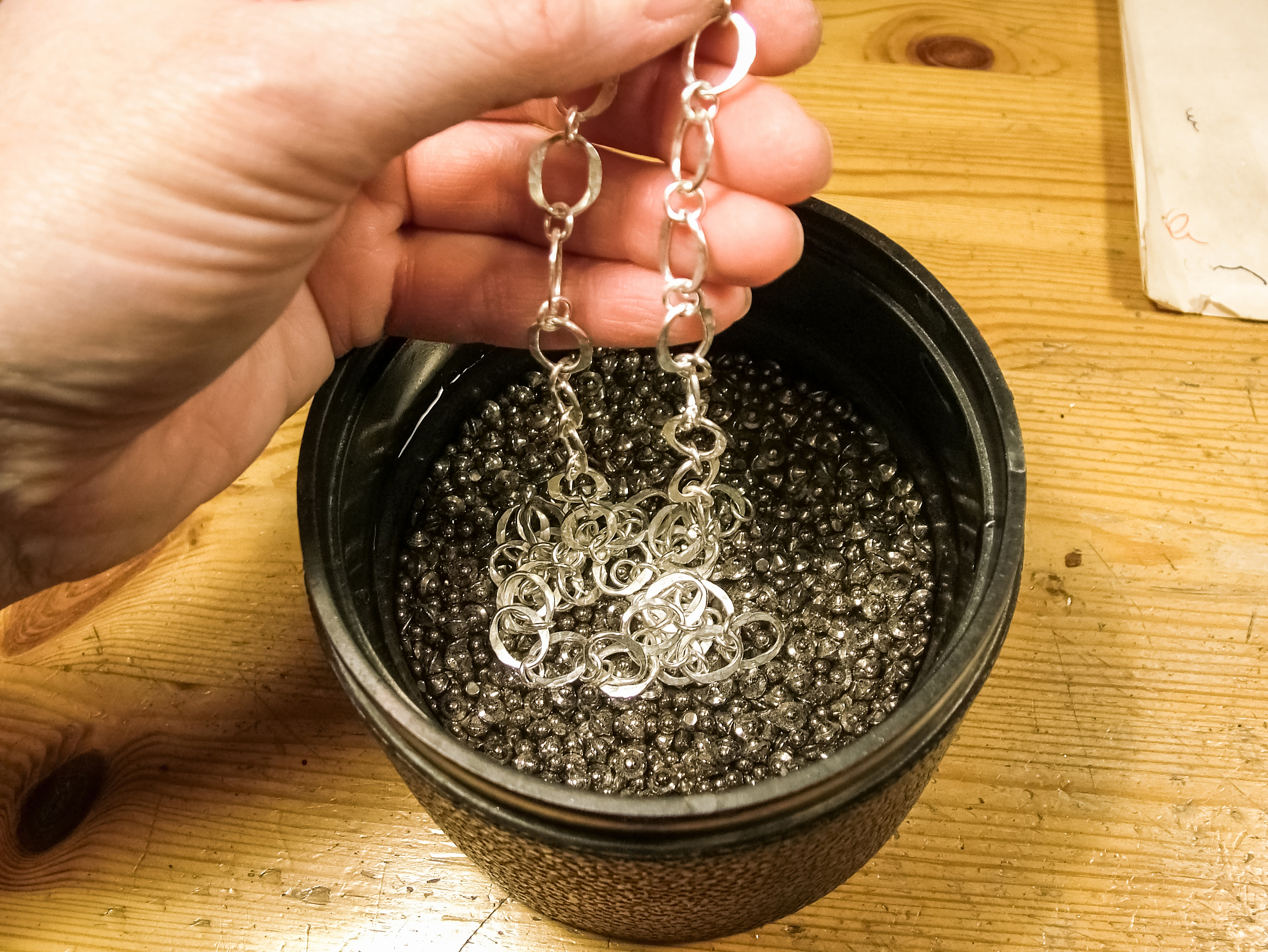
Rotary tumble drum with mixed steel shots and pins, water and soap.

Mass finishing is a group of manufacturing processes that allow large quantities of parts to be simultaneously finished. The goal of this type of finishing is to burnish, deburr, clean, radius, de-flash, descale, remove rust, polish, brighten, surface harden, prepare parts for further finishing, or break off die cast runners. The two main types of mass finishing are tumble finishing, also known as barrel finishing, and vibratory finishing. Both involve the use of a cyclical action to create grinding contact between surfaces. Sometimes the workpieces are finished against each other; however, usually a finishing medium is used. Mass finishing can be performed dry or wet; wet processes have liquid lubricants, cleaners, or abrasives, while dry processes do not. Cycle times can be as short as 10 minutes for nonferrous workpieces or as long as 2 hours for hardened steel.

Mass finishing processes can be configured as either batch systems, in which batches of workpieces are added, run, and removed before the next batch is run, or as continuous systems, in which the workpieces enter at one end and leave at the other end in the finished state. They may also be sequenced, which involves running the workpieces through multiple different mass finishing processes; usually, the finish becomes progressively finer. Due to the random action of the processes, mass finishing is as much an art as it is a science.

== Media ==
=== Functions of Media ===
Media are designed for four things:

Cut
Media which cut can remove burrs and can smooth surfaces. As a carrier of abrasive grain, the large medium pieces effectively increase the impact force of the abrasive on the metal part to be cut, thereby improving the efficiency of the abrasive. Cutting media develop dull, matte surfaces.

Luster
Some grades of medium are designed to promote luster on the surface of metal parts. These products are generally non-abrasive or have a very low degree of abrasiveness. They deburr by peening, rather than actually removing the burr. Media selection, therefore, will control the degree of surface luster, making the part bright and shiny or developing a very matte, dull surface characterized by a completely random scratch pattern, or anything in between.

Part separation
A very important function of the medium is to separate parts during the deburring, cutting, surface improving or burnishing operations. The media:parts volume ratio is normally used to control the amount of part-on-part contact which will occur in a vibratory or tumble finishing operation. At low ratios, considerable part-on-part contact occurs, while at higher ratios part-on-part contact is limited.

Surface scrubbing
Media have the unique ability to scrub surfaces and physically assist compounds in their cleaning function. Both abrasive and non-abrasive media are effective in this. They can remove organic soils, scale, and other inorganic residues. Media come in a wide range of materials in order to fulfill various needs.

=== Types of Media ===
Aluminum media
Aluminium media are typically cast parts and are available in a wide variety of shapes and sizes. Aluminum scrubs parts and can work in conjunction with cleaning compounds to clean parts. Since aluminum is fairly nonabrasive it tends to remove surface impurities without affecting the part's surface qualities. Its cost is typically higher than other cast media. Wear rates are lower than ceramic but higher than steel media.

Preformed ceramic media
Ceramic media are manufactured by mixing clay-like materials and water with abrasives, forming the mud into shapes, drying the shapes, and firing them at high temperatures to vitrify the binder. Many of these binders are porcelain-like in nature. Variability in these products occur both with the type of binder used, firing temperatures, the amount, size and type of abrasive grains they contain, and their uniformity of firing. This type of media today is the general workhorse of mass finishing systems and is the type of medium generally used, because of its availability in a variety of shapes and sizes, low cost, and low wear rate.

Preformed resin-bonded media
Plastic or resin-bonded media utilize a wider range of abrasive types and sizes than preformed ceramics. The most popular grades are those using quartz as an abrasive. Aluminum oxide, silicon carbide and other abrasives are also used. Usually, low-cost polyester resins are employed as the binder and the various shapes are produced by casting. Resin bonded media is good for preparing a metal surface for plating.

Steel
Case hardened, stress-relieved steel preformed shapes are available in a variety of sizes and configurations. Balls, balls with flat spots, ovoids (footballs), diagonally cut wire similar to angle-cut cylinders, ball cones and cones (both of which are different from the general concept of cones) and pins are the most commonly used. Steel media weigh approximately 300 pounds per cubic foot and are expensive for initial installation, but, because of their minimal attrition rate and extreme cleanliness, are being more widely used for light deburring applications and cleaning. Compounds are available to keep steel burnishing media clean and bright for extended periods.

Synthetic random-shaped media
The most popular synthetic random media is fused aluminum oxide, which is available in a number of grades. The more loosely bound, coarse-grained materials are characterized by fast cut and high depreciation rates. Because of the dark color of fused aluminum oxide, the soil generated by this material is excessive in many applications. Fine-grained fused aluminum oxide is generally employed for burnishing and in this respect is unexcelled in many applications with the possible exception of steel. Where some light cutting is required, fine-grained aluminum oxide can develop a better luster on stainless steels and other hard surfaces than can be achieved with steel burnishing media.

Natural random-shaped media
River rock, granite, quartz, limestone, emery and other naturally occurring abrasive materials are also used in vibratory and tumble finishing applications. In general, these media are not very efficient in vibratory equipment because of their high attrition rates.

Cobmeal, walnut-shell flour, and related materials
These are used for drying applications because of the natural ability of these materials to absorb water from metal surfaces. These can also be blended with abrasives and used for fine-polishing applications in vibratory, barrel, or spindle finishing equipment.

Other
Shoe pegs, leather, carpet tacks, and many other solid materials have been used at one time or another in tumble or vibratory finishing for certain applications.

== Compounds ==
Compounds are added to mass finishing processes to assist in deburring, burnishing, cutting, cleaning, descaling, and inhibiting corrosion. They may be liquids or dry powders. They are usually broken up into four types: deburring and finishing, burnishing, cleaning, and water stabilizing.

Deburring and finishing
These compounds are mainly designed to suspend the small particles created when deburring and abrading parts. They are also designed to keep workpieces clean and inhibit corrosion.
Burnishing
Burnishing compounds are designed to enhance brightness and to develop certain colors after mass finishing.
Cleaning
These compounds are usually dilute acids or soaps designed to remove soil, grease, or oil from the incoming parts. They also provide corrosion resistance for ferrous and non-ferrous parts.
Water stabilizers
These are used in conjunction with water to maintain a consistent water hardness and level of metal ions. This helps ensure consistent results from batch to batch.
