= Gas cluster ion beam =

Beam of cluster ions

Gas cluster ion beams (GCIB) is a technology for nano-scale modification of surfaces. It can smooth a wide variety of surface material types to within an angstrom of roughness without subsurface damage. It is also used to chemically alter surfaces through infusion or deposition.

== Process ==
Using GCIB a surface is bombarded by a beam of high-energy, nanoscale cluster ions. The clusters are formed when a high pressure gas (approximately 10 atmospheres pressure) expands into a vacuum (1e-5 atmospheres). The gas expands adiabatically and cools then condenses into clusters. The clusters are nano-sized bits of crystalline matter with unique properties that are intermediate between the realms of atomic physics and those of solid state physics. The expansion takes place inside of a nozzle that shapes the gas flow and facilitates the formation of a narrow jet of clusters moving along the axis of symmetry of the nozzle. The jet of clusters passes through differential pumping apertures into a region of high vacuum (1e-8 atmospheres) where the clusters are ionized by collisions with energetic electrons. The ionized clusters are accelerated electrostatically to high velocities, and they are focused into a tight beam.

The GCIB beam is then used to treat a surface — typically the treated substrate is mechanically scanned in the beam to allow uniform irradiation of the surface. Argon is a commonly used gas in GCIB treatments because it is chemically inert and inexpensive. Argon forms clusters readily, the atoms in the cluster are bound together with Van der Waals forces. Typical parameters for a high-energy, Argon GCIB are acceleration voltage 30 kV, average cluster size 10,400 atoms, average cluster charge +3.2, average cluster energy 64 keV, average cluster velocity 6.5 km/s, with a total electric current of 200 μA or more. When an Argon cluster with these parameters strikes a surface, a shallow crater is formed with a diameter of approximately 20 nm and a depth of 10 nm. When imaged using atomic force microscope (AFM) the craters have an appearance much like craters on planetary bodies. A typical GCIB surface treatment allows every point on the surface to be struck by many cluster ions, resulting in smoothing of surface irregularities.

Lower energy GCIB treatments can be used to further smooth the surface. Reducing the energy decreases the size and depth of the impact craters and, analogous to mechanical polishing where the grit size is reduced during polishing, subsequent treatments with lower energies are used to reach an atomic level smoothness. Low energy clusters can be used to harden and densify the surface. Advantages of GCIB surface polishing over conventional polishing include the ability to easily smooth non-planer surfaces, very thin substrates and thin-films. GCIB assisted thin-film deposition produces denser and more uniform films. Almost any gas can be used for GCIB, and there are many more uses for chemically reactive clusters such as for doping semiconductors (using B_{2}H_{6} gas), cleaning and etching (using NF_{3} gas), oxidizing (using O_{2} gas), reducing oxide (using H_{2} gas), nitriding (using N_{2} gas), and for depositing chemical layers. GCIB can be applied to any substrate material and is effective in smoothing nanoscale and atomic scale roughness.

== Industrial applications ==
In industry, GCIB has been used for the manufacture of semiconductor devices, optical thin films, trimming SAW and FBAR filter devices, fixed disk memory systems and for other uses. GCIB smoothing of high voltage electrodes has been shown to reduce field electron emission and GCIB treated RF cavities are being studied for use in future high energy particle accelerators.

Small argon cluster GCIB sources are increasingly used for analytical depth-profiling by secondary ion mass spectrometry (SIMS) and X-ray photoelectron spectroscopy (XPS). Argon clusters greatly reduce the damage introduced to the specimen during depth-profiling, making it practical to do so for many organic and polymeric materials for the first time. This has greatly extended the range of materials to which XPS (for example) can be applied. Gas cluster sputter rates of different polymers differ a great deal, and X-ray damage (of the type that accumulates during XPS analysis) can change these sputter rates markedly. While generally less damaging than monotomic sputtering, gas cluster ion sputtering can nevertheless introduce damage that is very noticeable in some materials.

A related technique, with a limited range of applications, using high-velocity carbon Fullerenes to treat surfaces, has been studied.

Accelerated neutral atoms beams (ANAB) is a recent variation on GCIB. With ANAB, the high velocity clusters are heated and evaporated by collisions with thermal energy gas molecules and the charged cluster remnants are deflected out of the beam leaving an intense focused beam of individual fast neutral monomers/atoms. The monomers are evaporated from the clusters with low thermal energies and they retain the center of mass velocity of the cluster and hence do not move out of the beam before colliding with the surface. When used to treat a surface, an ANAB beam has nearly the same total energy and velocity of the original GCIB beam but the smoothing effect on the surface is much different as the dispersed impacts of the individual fast atoms is more gentle than that of the clusters. With ANAB there is even less subsurface damage than with GCIB. The lack of electrical charge eliminates space-charge defocusing of the beam and static charge buildup on surfaces which is very useful for applications such as semiconductor device manufacturing.
