= Flame polishing =

Flame polishing, also known as fire polishing, is a method of polishing a material, usually glass or thermoplastics, by exposing it to a flame or heat. When the surface of the material briefly melts, surface tension smooths the surface. Operator skill is critical with this method. When done properly, flame plastic polishing produces the clearest finish, especially when polishing acrylic. This method is most applicable to flat external surfaces. Flame polishing is frequently used in acrylic plastic fabrication because of its high speed compared to abrasive methods. In this application, an oxyhydrogen torch is typically used, one reason being that the flame chemistry is unlikely to contaminate the plastic.

Flame polishing is essential to creation of the glass pipettes used for the patch clamp technique of voltage clamping.

== Equipment ==
Various machines and torches/gas burners are used in the flame polishing process. Depending on the heating requirements for an intended application, different kinds of gases are used including but not limited to: natural gas, propane and oxygen, oxygen and hydrogen. A specially designed machine called the hydro flame is commonly used in flame polishing. The hydro flame is a gas-powered generator that uses distilled water and electricity to create oxygen and hydrogen for its flame. The size, shape, and chemistry of the flames used in fire polishing can vary widely based on the type and shape of the material being polished.

== See also ==
- Fire hardening, also known as "fire polishing", a primitive process for hardening wood
