= Polishing =

Rubbing a surface to make it smooth

Polishing is the process of creating a smooth and shiny surface by rubbing it or by applying a chemical treatment, leaving a clean surface with a significant specular reflection (still limited by the index of refraction of the material according to the Fresnel equations). In some materials (such as metals, glasses, black or transparent stones), polishing is also able to reduce diffuse reflection to minimal values.

When an unpolished surface is magnified thousands of times, it usually looks like a succession of mountains and valleys. By repeated abrasion, those "mountains" are worn down until they are flat or just small "hills". The process of polishing with abrasives starts with a coarse grain size and gradually proceeds to the finer ones to efficiently flatten the surface imperfections and to obtain optimal results.

== Mechanical properties ==
The strength of polished products can be higher than their unpolished counterparts owing to the removal of stress concentrations present in the rough surface during the polishing process. These concentrations take the form of corners and other defects, which magnify the local stress beyond the inherent strength of the material.

== Types ==
=== Metalworking ===
Other polishing processes include:

- Burnishing
- Mass finishing
  - Tumble finishing
  - Vibratory finishing
- Soda blasting

=== Woodworking ===
- French polishing
- Wood finishing

=== Other ===
- Chemical-mechanical polishing, which is used in semiconductor fabrication
- Fabrication and testing of optical components
- Flame polishing, a type of polishing used on glass and thermoplastics
- Ultra-fine, abrasive paste polishing, polishing for soft or fragile work surfaces
- Vapor polishing, a method of polishing plastics to optical clarity
