= Hydro-erosive grinding =

Hydro-erosive grinding (HEG) is a process for radiusing orifice edges and hole intersections by flowing an abrasive fluid through. This process can calibrate the holes to flow a certain static flow rate.

== See also ==
- Abrasive flow machining
