= Tumble finishing =

Technique for smoothing and polishing a rough surface on relatively small parts

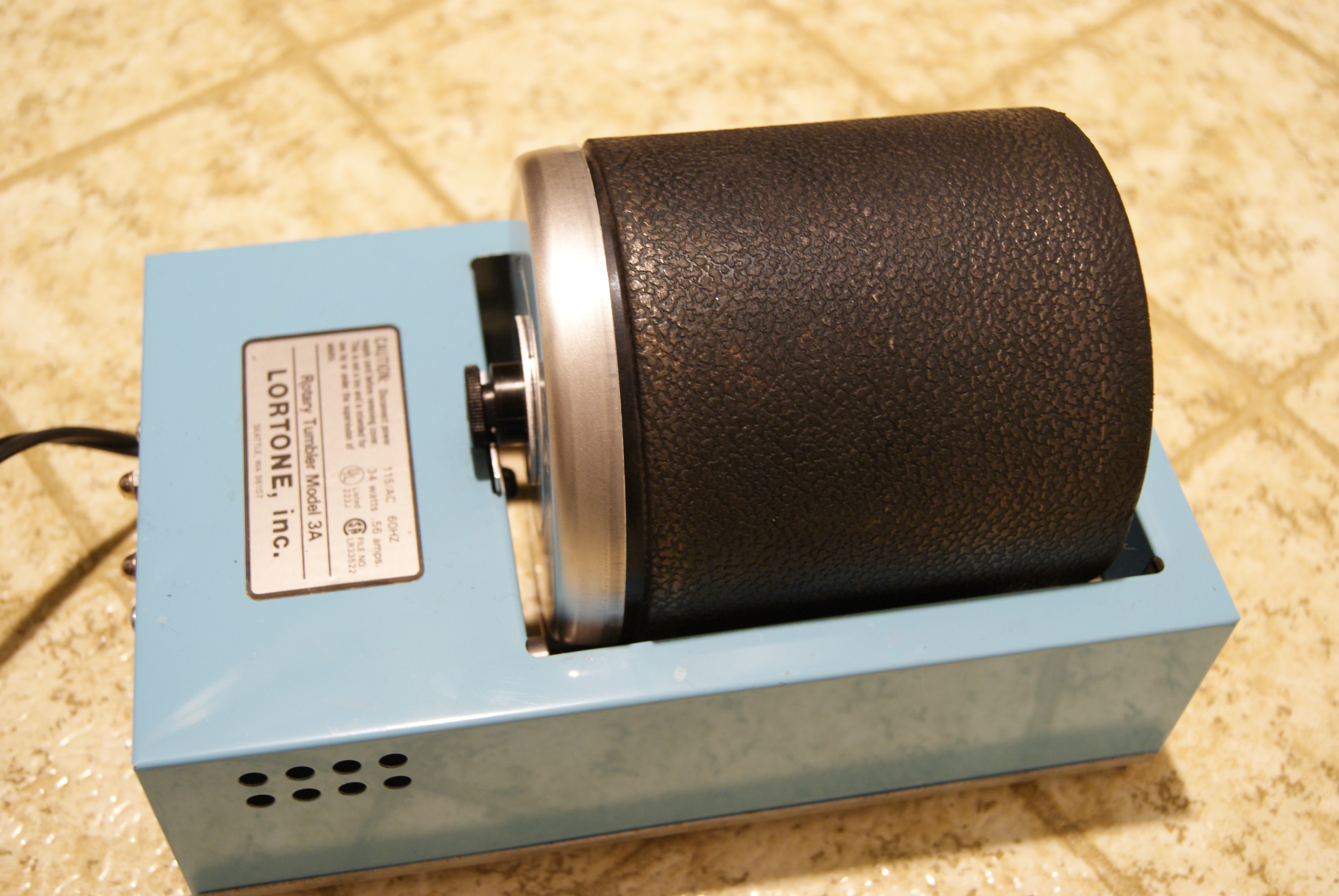
Small rock tumbler with the barrel in place, ready to rotate

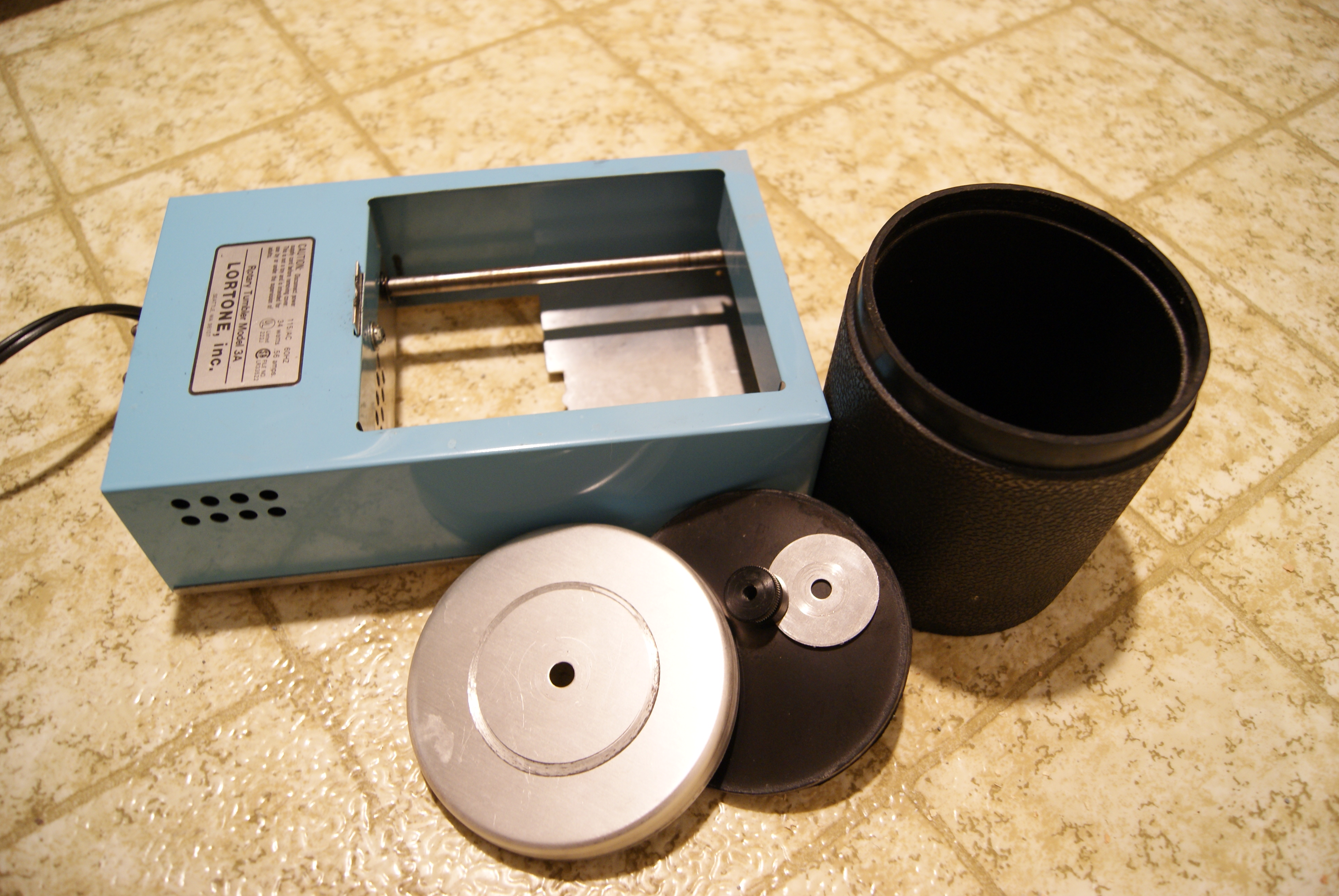
Parts breakdown

Tumble finishing, also known as tumbling or rumbling, is a technique for smoothing and polishing a rough surface on relatively small parts. In the field of metalworking, a similar process called barreling, or barrel finishing, works upon the same principles.

Tumbled stones are made with rock tumblers in a process very similar to the natural processes that produce "sea glass" or "beach glass".

== Stones ==
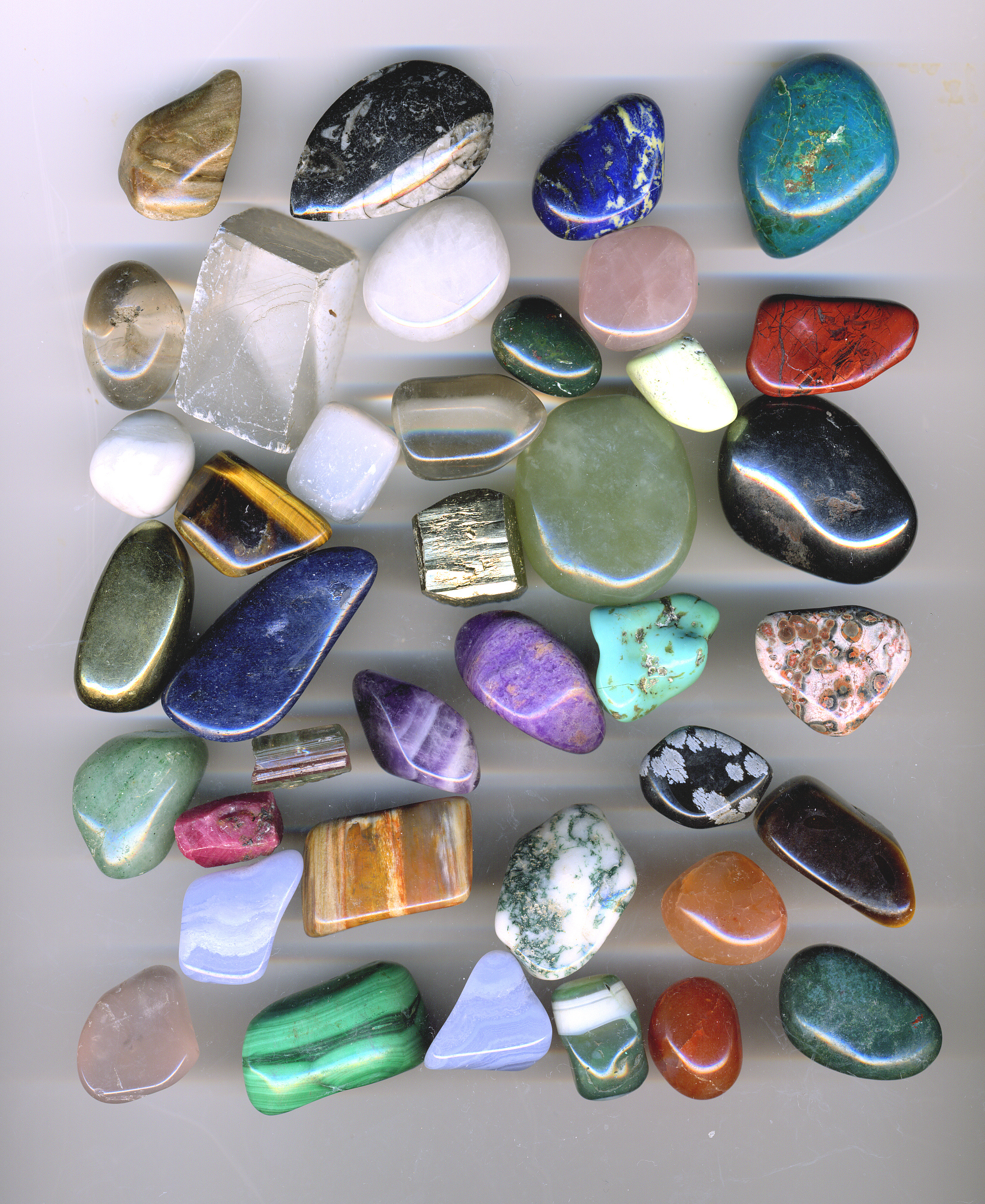
A collection of gemstone pebbles. Most of these stones, except four rough ones, were tumbled and polished.

Tumbling of rocks as a lapidary technique for rock polishing usually requires a plastic or rubber-lined barrel loaded with a consignment of rocks, all of similar or the same hardness, some abrasive grit, and a liquid lubricant. Silicon carbide grit is commonly used, and water is a universal lubricant. The barrel is then placed upon slowly rotating rails so that it rotates. The optimal speed of rotation depends on the size of the tumbler barrel and materials involved. Vibratory finishing process can be used instead.

A well-chosen speed for stone polishing causes the rocks within the barrel to slide past each other, with the abrasive grit between them. The result of this depends on the coarseness of the abrasive, and the duration of the tumble.

Typically, a full tumble polish from rough rock to polish takes 3–5 weeks, and is done in a minimum of 3 steps. Initially, the rocks are smoothed with a coarse grit (such as 60-90 mesh). The idea behind the first step is to take rough rock or stone and grind it (tumble it) down into a form which is indistinguishable (in shape) from the final product. This is followed by washing and then a stage of finer grits (120-220 then 400-600 mesh), before the (optional) use of a pre-polishing compound (1200 grit), a washing cycle with detergent to remove any grit on the stones. The final step is a polishing stage using powdered polish, (such as cerium oxide or tin oxide), water, and often small plastic pellets that are designed to cushion the stones as they tumble (so as not to cause chipping) and carry the polish evenly across the stones.

The precise tumbling duration is determined by many factors, including the hardness of the rock and the degree of smoothing desired in the coarser steps. Some people will tumble stones with rough grit for two, three or even four weeks to get their desired shapes out of the stones.

There are two main types of rock tumbling: barrel (rotary) tumbling, and vibratory tumbling. Rotary tumbling is more common, simpler, quieter and less expensive than vibratory tumblers. There are two differentiating factors, however, that may lead one to use a vibratory tumbler. First, vibratory tumblers retain the overall shape of the rough rock, whereas rotary tumblers tend to make rocks round. Thus, it is important to use vibratory tumblers to make faceted shapes and tear drop forms. Second, vibratory tumblers tend to work much faster than rotary tumblers, generally reducing the processing time to half.

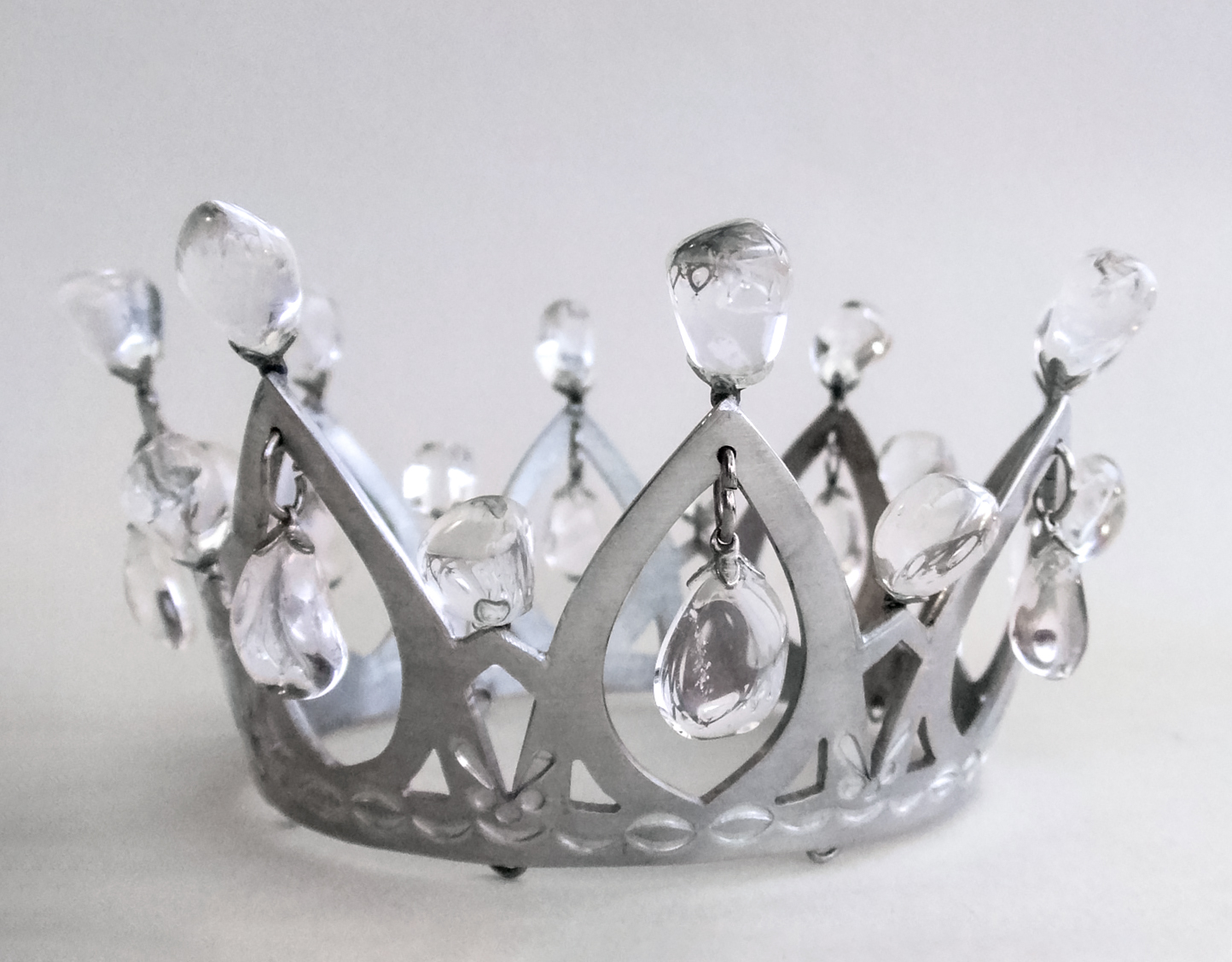
Bridal crown made from pure tin and tumble polished rock crystals in 1984.

In the polishing step, rock polish is added in place of grit as well as the plastic tumbling pellets. After further tumbling, the rocks should now have a shiny look when dry. If this is not the case and the rocks appear to have a film on them, a burnishing step may be necessary. In burnishing, the rocks are tumbled with only the plastic pellets and the addition of an oil-free non-abrasive soap.

Sometimes, stone "preforms" are used. These are shapes cut from the rough rock before tumbling. This gives more control over the final piece, so shapes such as a tear drop can be produced. The technique is still limited to rounded shapes. Preforms may use less time with the coarsest step, or skip it altogether.

During the 1970s, small rock tumblers were a common hobby item, and jewellery decorated with tumbled semi-precious stones was very much in fashion. Likewise, dishes and decorative glass jars filled with tumbled stones (often including common rocks not suitable even for costume jewelry) were frequently used as household ornaments.

== Metal ==
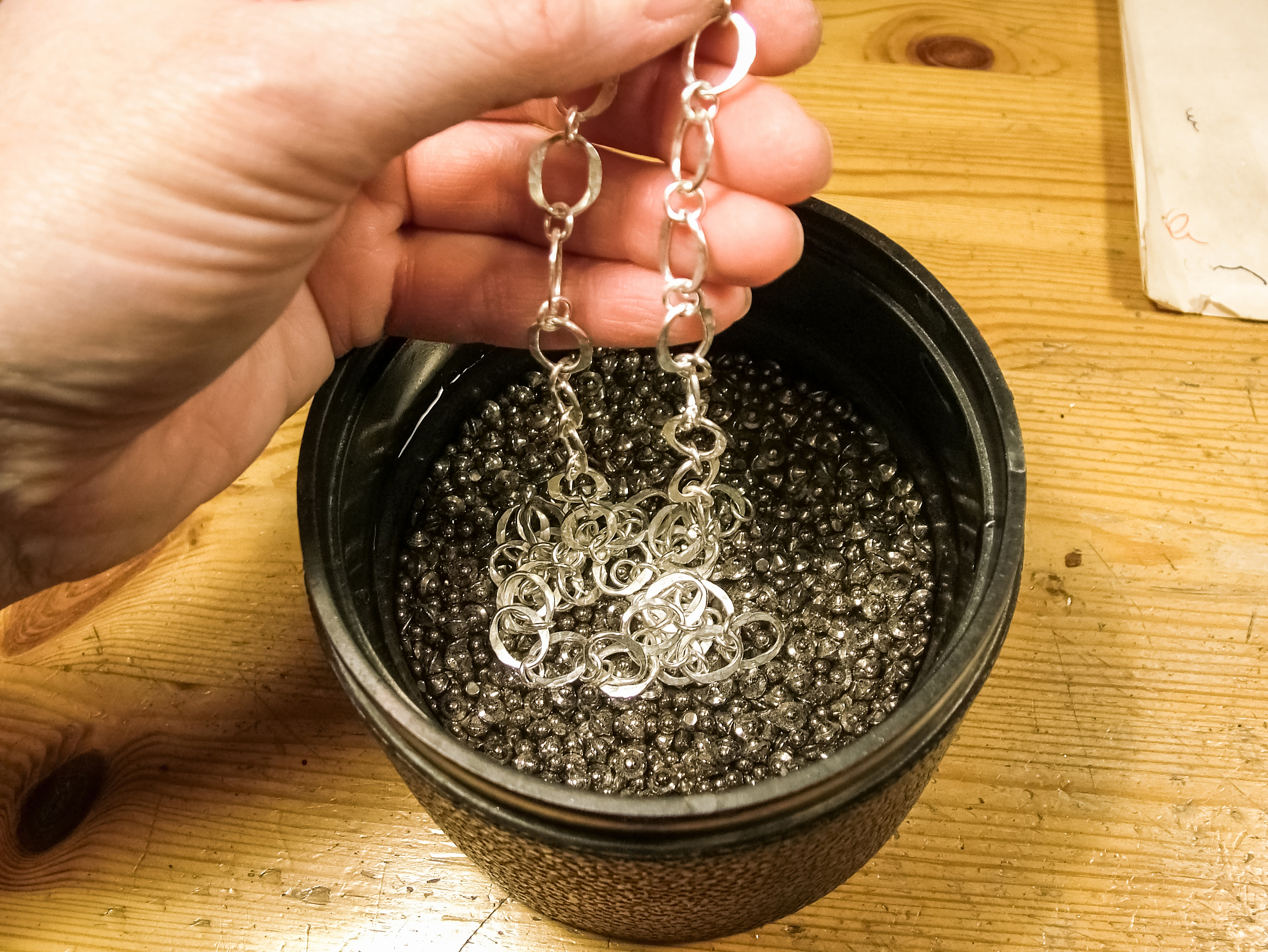
A silver chain is placed in a tumble drum with mixed steel shots and pins, water and soap, to polish the chain. The drum will be closed and put on a tumbler rack for about 18 hours.

Metal tumbling is used to burnish, deburr, clean, radius, de-flash, descale, remove rust, polish, brighten, surface harden, prepare parts for further finishing, and break off die cast runners. The process is fairly simple: a horizontal barrel is filled with the parts which is then rotated. Variations of this process usually include media, water, or other lubricants. As the barrel is rotated the material rises until gravity causes the uppermost layer to landslide down to the other side. The barrel may also have vanes, typically made of rubber, which run along the inside of the barrel. As the barrel turns the vanes catch and lift the parts, which eventually slide down or fall.

In a wet processes a compound, lubricant, or barreling soap is added to aid the finishing process, prevent rusting, and to clean parts. A wide variety of media is available to achieve the desired finished product. Common media materials include: sand, granite chips, slag, steel, ceramics, and synthetics. Moreover, these materials are available in a wide variety of shapes. Usually different shapes are used in the same load to reach into every geometry of the part.

Tumbling is an economical finishing process because large batches of parts can be run with little or no supervision by the operator. A full cycle can take anywhere from 6 to 24 hours with the barrel turning at 20 to 38 RPM. Tumbling is usually most efficient with the barrel half full. Some processes also use a filter system to allow parts or other materials in the cylinder to be separated.

The disadvantages of this process are that the abrasive action cannot be limited to only certain areas of the part, cycle times are long, and the process is noisy.

=== Specific types ===
Barrel burnishing is a type of barreling where no cutting action is desired. The goal is to reduce minute irregularities and produce a clean, smooth surface. The parts are usually tumbled against themselves or with steel balls, shot, rounded-end pins, or ballcones to achieve this. It is also usually a wet process that uses water and a lubricant or cleaning agent, such as soap or cream of tartar. The barrel is not loaded more than half full and if media is used then a 2:1 ratio of media to parts is maintained to keep the parts from rubbing.

Centrifugal barrel tumbling uses a tumbling barrel at the end of a rotating arm to add centrifugal forces to the barreling process. This can accelerate the process 25 to 50 times.

Spindle finishing mounts the workpieces onto spindles that rotate the parts opposite that of the media flow. This prevents the parts from interacting with each other and accelerates the cycle time, but extra time and cost are required to fixture the workpieces.

== Glass ==
Stained glass shards used for mosaic glass are also tumbled. No abrasive is used, to avoid clouding the glass; there is only water as a lubricant. The object of this tumbling is to remove the sharp edges from the glass, so that it may be handled safely. As little as 8 hours of tumbling may be sufficient for tumbled glass.

== Other ==
Tumbling is used to polish and smooth dice for recreational use, but it has the unfortunate effect of making their sides and faces somewhat uneven and thus making the dice less than fair.

Tumbling can be used in 3D printing to correct small artifacts on the printed objects, such as visible layers.

These techniques, although they take a long time, involve very little operator intervention and thus are very cheap. Small tumblers (one pound capacity) are available and inexpensive for home/hobbyist use. At the other end of the scale, professionals can use very large barrels to do a lot of work at once. The main disadvantage of tumbling is its limited scope - stones will be smooth and have semi-random shapes (like pebbles from the beach), and metals need to be relatively simple shapes, with no fine work.

== See also ==
- Ball mill, a process with some similarities to tumble polishing
