= Dremel =

Multinational brand of power tools known primarily for its rotary tools

- Founded: 1932; 94 years ago in Racine, Wisconsin, U.S.
- Founder: Albert J. Dremel
- Headquarters: 1800 W. Central Rd., Mt. Prospect, Illinois, U.S.
- Products: Rotary tools, hot glue guns, scroll saws, sanders, soldering irons, and powered screwdrivers
- Parent: Bosch
- Website: dremel.com

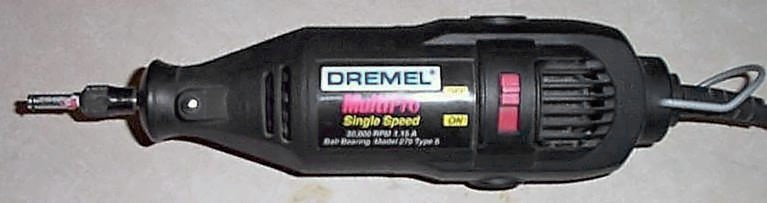
A single-speed Dremel 'MultiPro' electric die grinder.

Dremel (/ˈdrɛməl/ DREM-əl) is a multinational brand of power tools, focusing on home improvement and hobby applications. Dremel is known primarily for its rotary tools, such as the Dremel 3000, 4000 and 8200 series, which are similar to the pneumatic die grinders used in the metalworking industry by tool or moldmakers. Dremel later expanded its product range and now produces butane tools, benchtop and hand-held saws and oscillating tools. The company was purchased by Robert Bosch GmbH in 1993, and is now a division of the Robert Bosch Tool Corporation.

== History ==
Dremel die grinder tools were originally developed by Albert J. Dremel, an Austrian inventor, who founded the Dremel Company in Racine, Wisconsin, US in 1932. Dremel held 55 patents across a wide range of inventions. His first product, released within the company, was an electric razor-blade sharpener. Dremel then developed the high-speed lightweight rotary tool, later named the Dremel Multitool, for which the company continues to be known.

In the 1940s, the United States Department of Defense reportedly used Dremel rotary tools during the development of the first atomic bomb.

In 2013, Dremel claimed that there were more than 17 million of their rotary tools in use.

- 1932 – Albert J. Dremel founded the Dremel company.
- 1935 – Introduction of first hand-held high-speed rotary tool, called the Moto-Tool.
- 1939 – The Dremel Moto-Saw was developed.
- 1964 – Introduction of the Dremel electric engraver.
- 1973 – Introduction of compact table saw and multi-use disc/belt sander. Dremel Manufacturing Company was acquired by Emerson Electric
- 1993 – The Dremel brand purchased by Robert Bosch Tool Corporation.
- 2003 – Dremel introduces the lithium-ion battery for power tools. New tool creation of the Dremel 10.8 Volt lithium-ion.

== Rotary tools ==
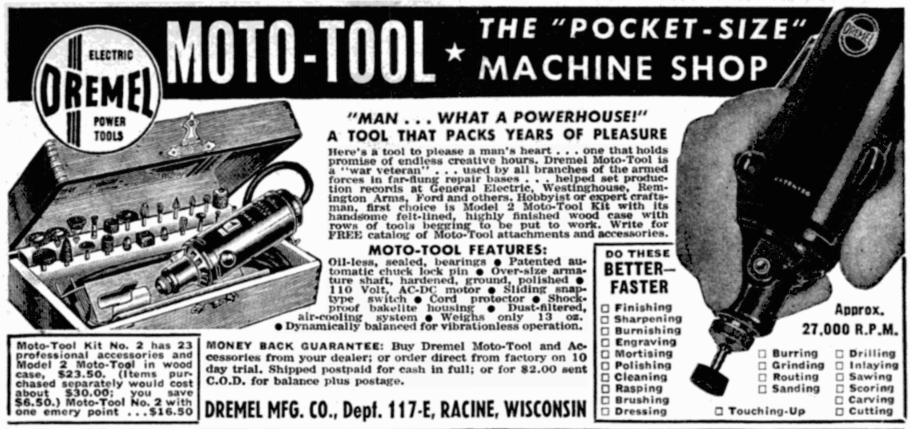
1947 advertisement for the Dremel Moto-Tool die grinder

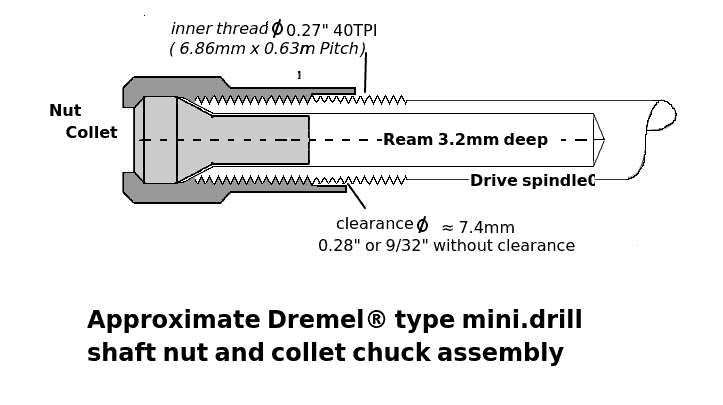
Approximate Dremel type spindle and collet/nut arrangement

| Diameter | Imperial | Metric |
| Dremel | inch | mm* |
|---|---|---|
| 480 | 0.125″ (1/8″) | 3.0–3.2 mm |
| 481 | 0.094″ (3/32″) | 2.4–2.5 mm |
| 482 | 0.063″ (1/16″) | 1.5–1.6 mm |
| 483 | 0.031″ (1/32″) | 0.8–1.0 mm |

== Other tools ==
Dremel produces hot glue guns, scroll saws, butane torches and powered screwdrivers, as well as accessories and attachments.

In late 2008, Dremel released an oscillating tool, after the patent for the Fein Multimaster had run out. Dremel's version of the tool is called the Multi-Max.

3Pi Tech Solutions sell 3D printers with the Dremel brand.
