= Stippling =

Method of creating a pattern

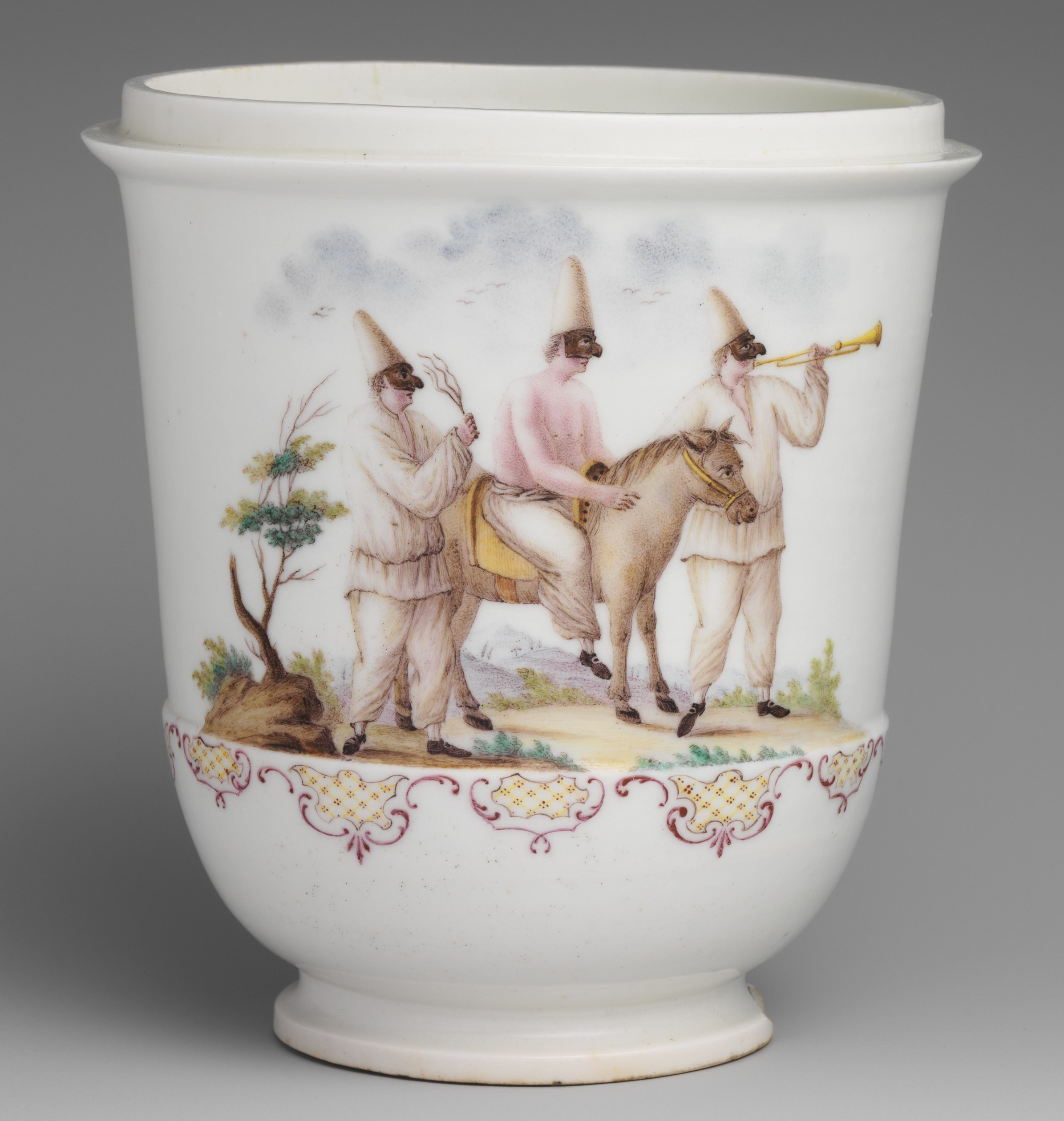
Capodimonte porcelain jar painted in the stipple style of Giovanni Caselli with three figures of Pulcinella from the commedia dell'arte, 1745–1750

Graphics complex of a seashell with stipple shading modeled in Mathematica 13.1

Stippling is the creation of a pattern simulating varying degrees of solidity or shading by using small dots. Such a pattern may occur in nature and these effects are frequently emulated by artists.

== Art ==
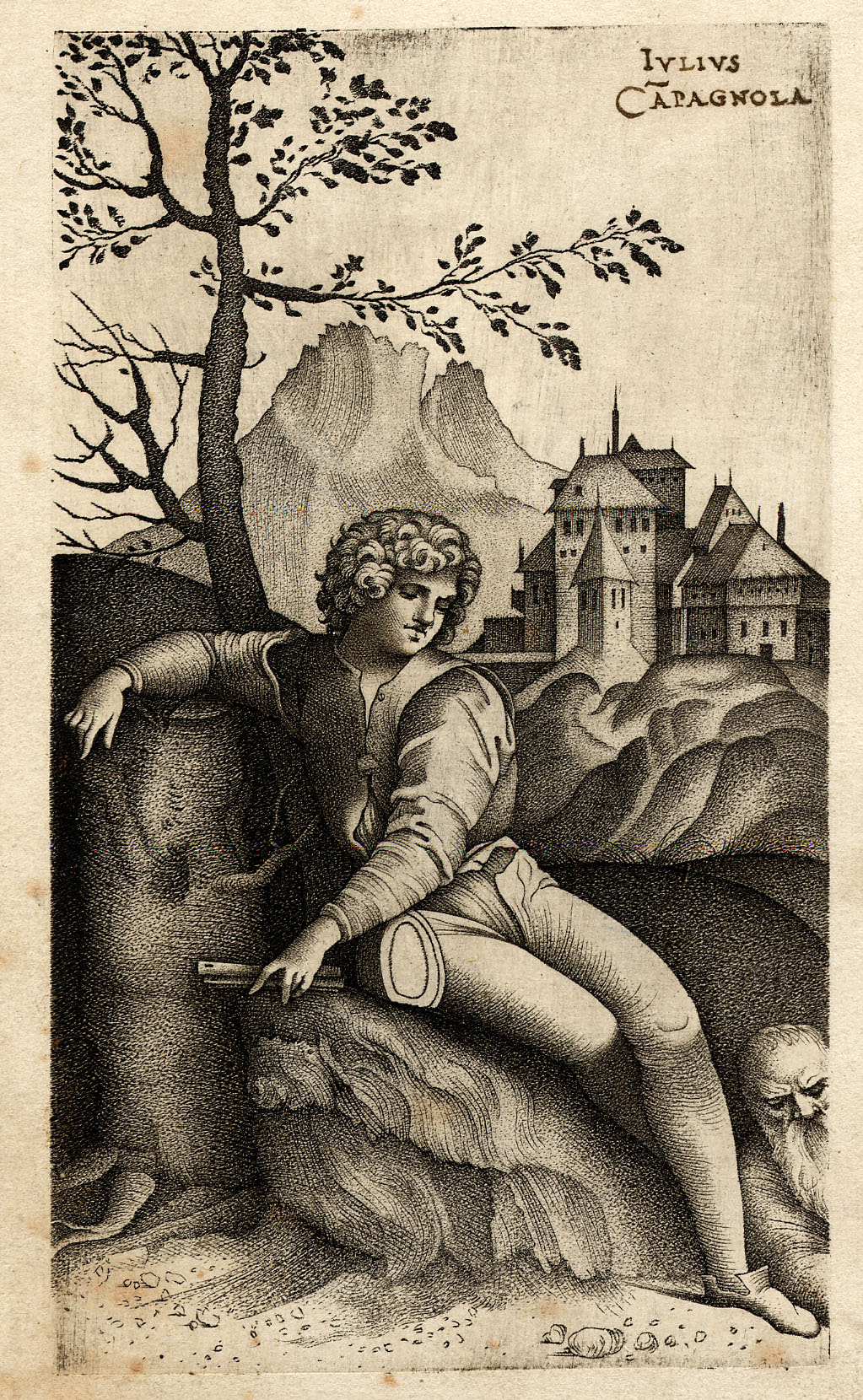
The Young Shepherd, engraving using stipple technique by Giulio Campagnola, around 1510

In printmaking, stipple engraving is a technique using flicks of the burin to build up the image in short lines or dots, often combined with conventional linear engraving. In engraved glass a similar stipple technique has often been popular.

In a drawing or painting, the dots are made of pigment of a single colour, applied with a pen or brush; the denser the dots, the darker the apparent shade—or lighter, if the pigment is lighter than the surface. This is similar to—but distinct from—pointillism, which uses dots of different colours to simulate blended colours.

== Botany ==
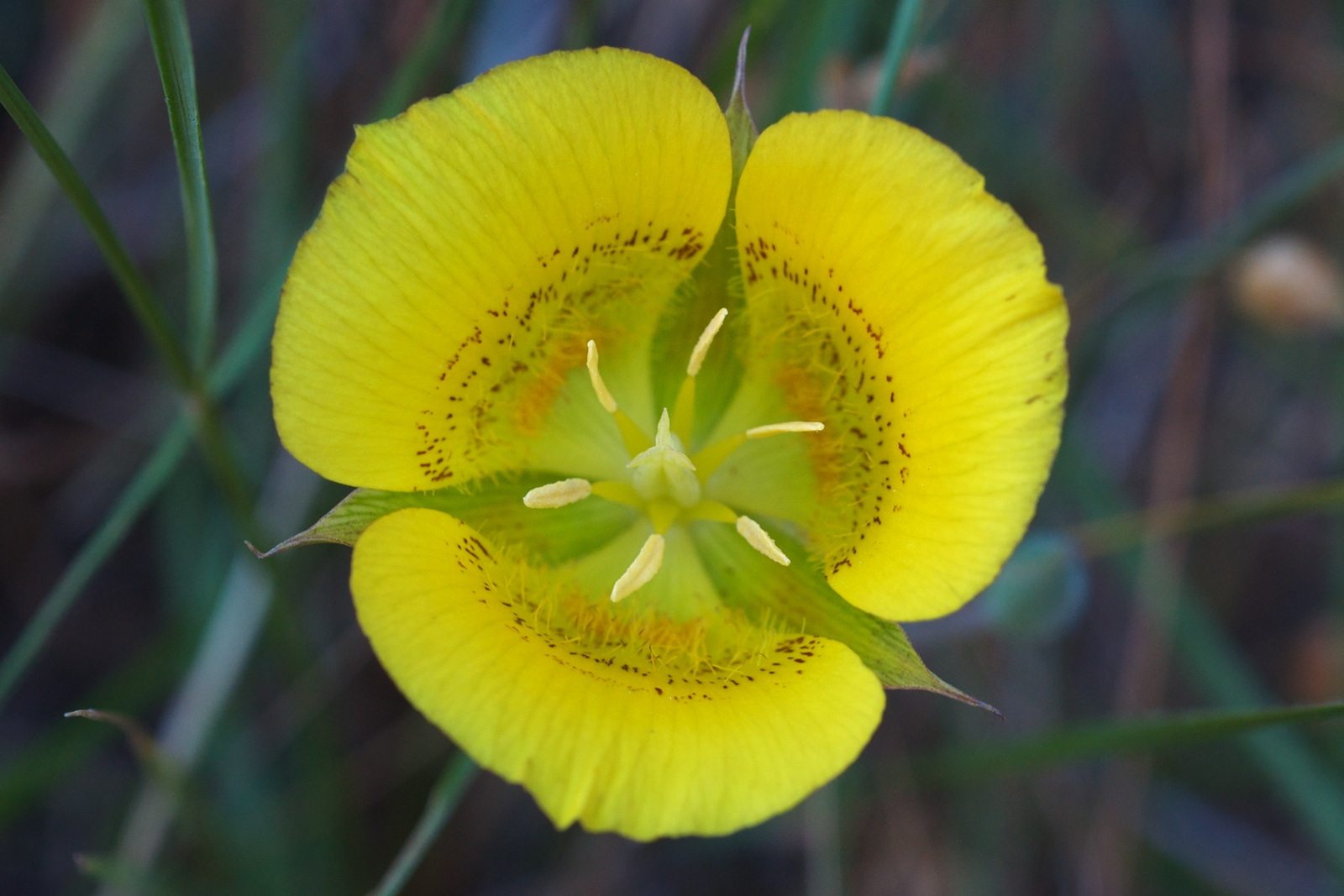
An example of stippling on the petals of Calochortus luteus

In description of flora species, a stippling is a kind of pattern, especially in the case of flowering plants, produced in nature that occurs on flower petals and sepals. These are similar to the dot patterns in artworks that produce an often intricate pattern. An example can be seen on the base of the petal insides of Calochortus luteus, a lily endemic to California.

== Other uses ==
In forensic science, stippling refers to a pattern of gunshot residue burned into the skin that results from close proximity to a discharged firearm.

In gunsmithing, stippling is used to engrave patterns on the firearm's grip to provide a more solid grip by creating more friction. This modification is done only on pistols with polymer frames since they have one-piece frames and solid grips, while steel-framed pistols usually have a hollow grip with textured grip scales to provide friction. If the user is willing to take the possibility of failing the procedure and getting permanent, unwanted results they can stipple their own pistols since the procedure only requires either a soldering iron or a small, handheld rotary tool with burr bits.

== See also ==
- Dithering
- Halftone
- Pointillism
