= Multi-tool =

Hand tool combining several individual functions

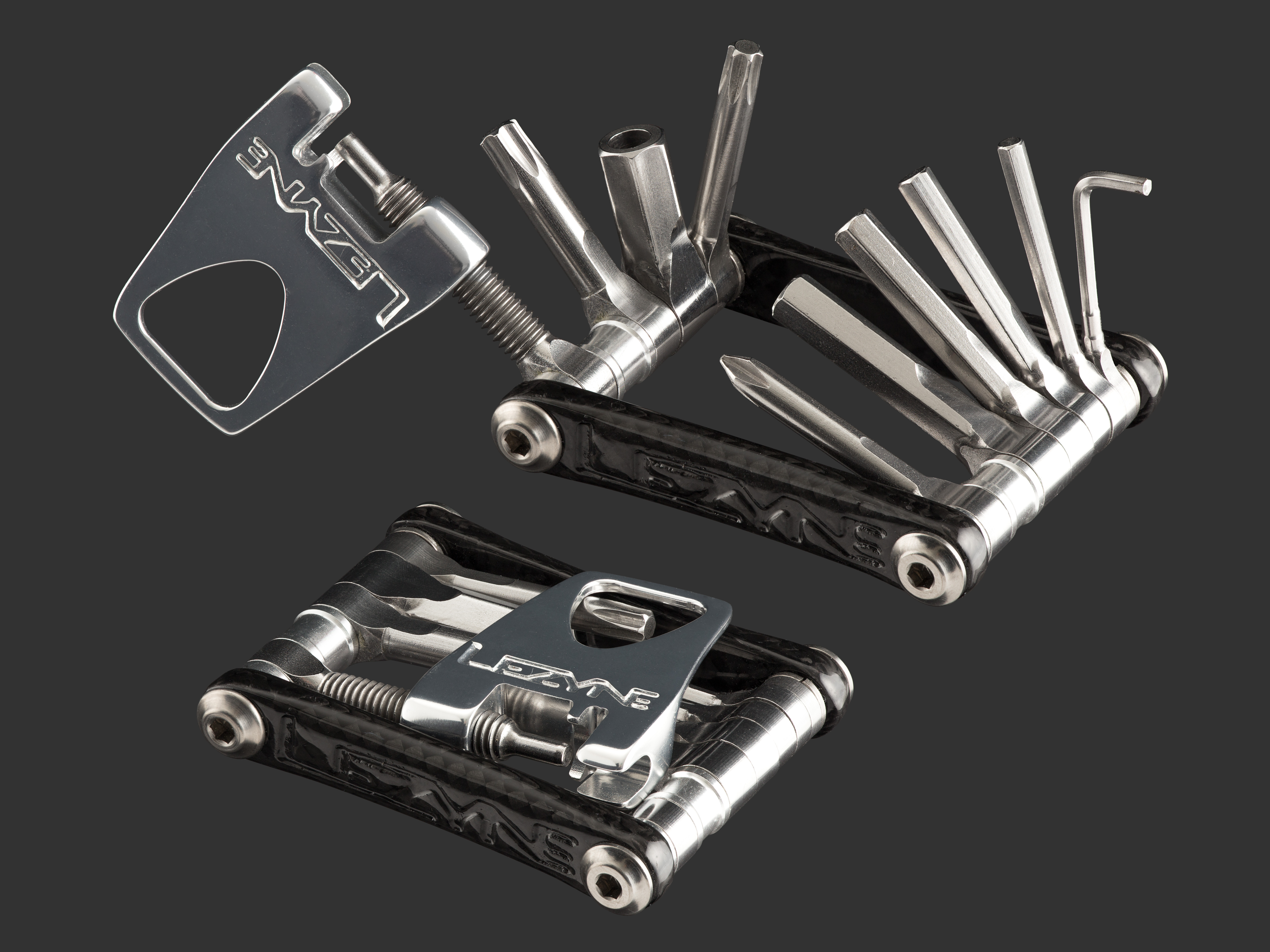
Bicycle multi-tool folded (left) and unfolded

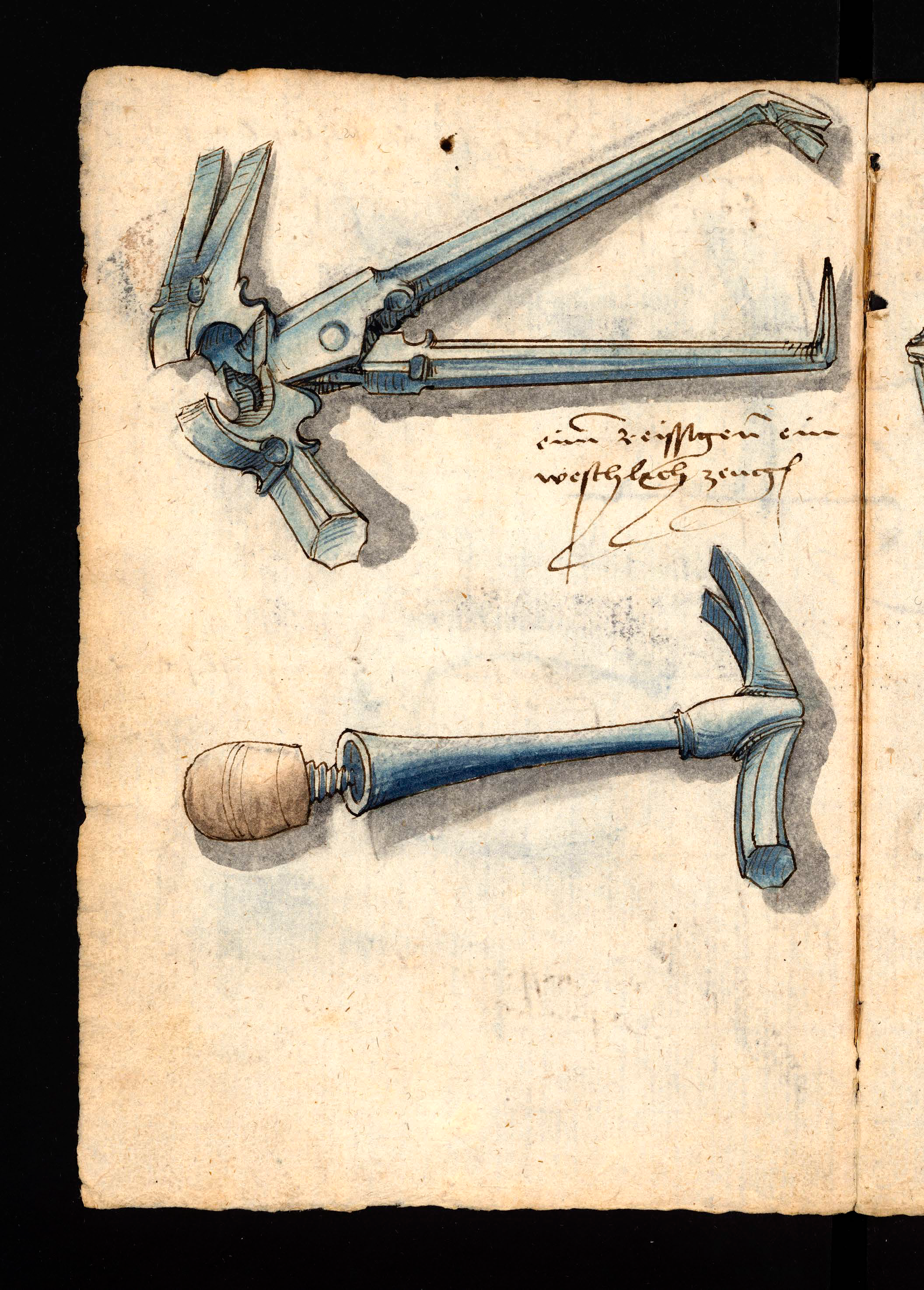
Two multi-tools from Codex Löffelholz, Nuremberg 1505

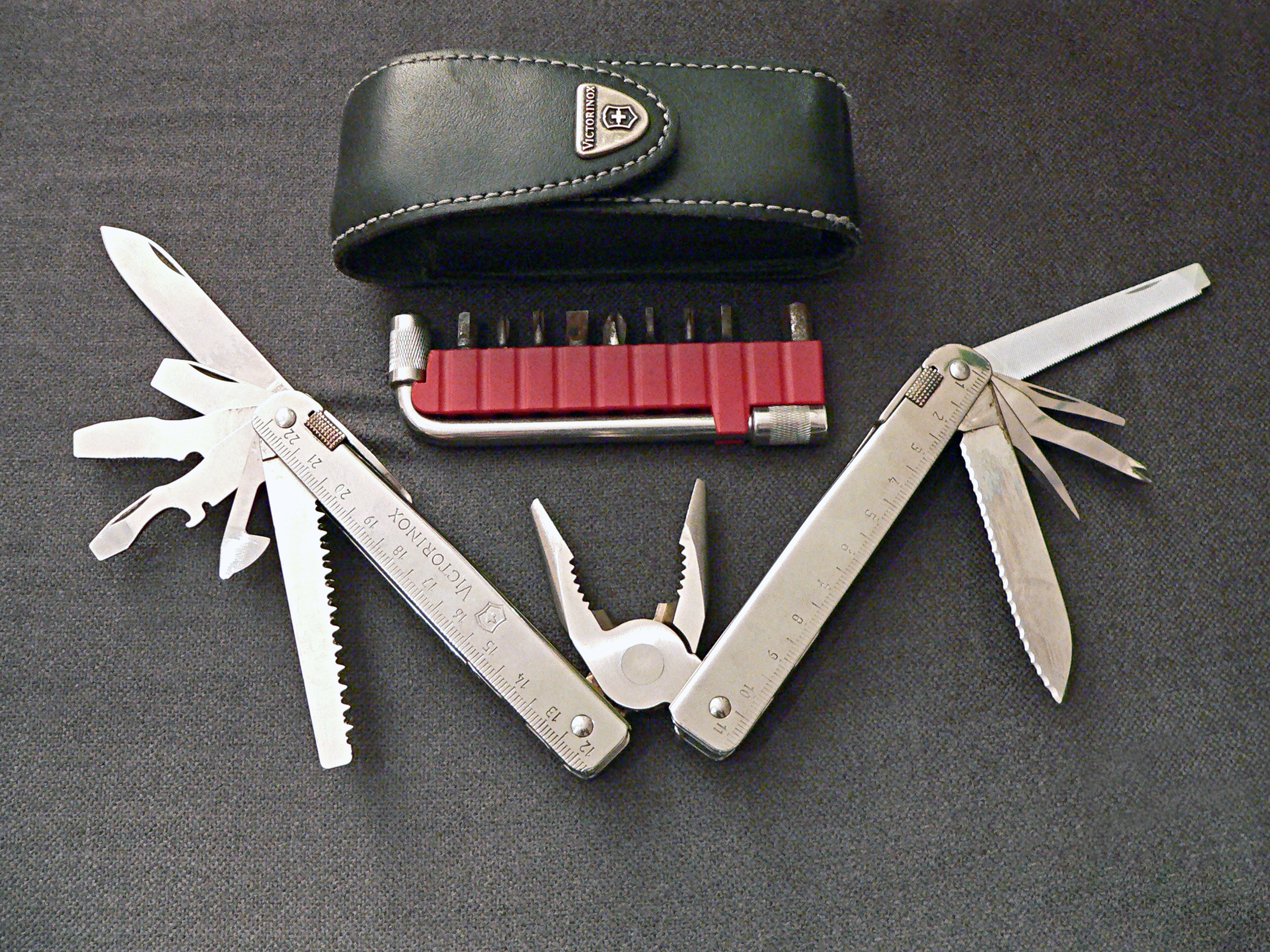
Victorinox SwissTool

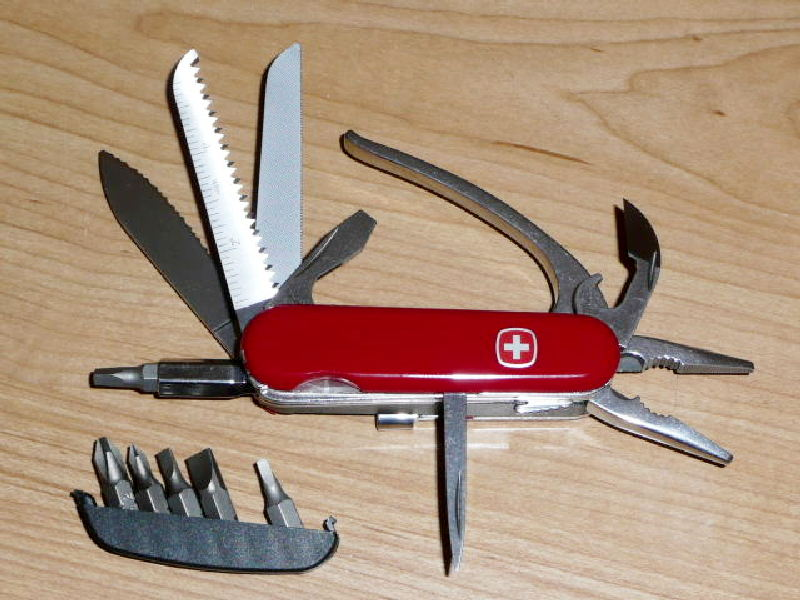
Wenger PocketGrip

A multi-tool (or multitool) is a hand tool that combines several individual functions in a single unit. The smallest are credit-card or key sized units designed for carrying in a wallet or on a keyring, but others are designed to be carried in a trouser pocket or belt-mounted pouch.

== History ==
=== Ancient origins ===
The history of the multitool is a significant chapter in the evolution of portable technology, with its origins traceable to the middle Roman period. During the reign of Emperor Trajan, Roman craftsmen produced silver folding implements that integrated functions such as spoons, forks and spatulas. These devices served as versatile dining sets for travellers as Roman influence expanded across the empire.

These ancient tools provided a variety of gadgets within a single unit, functioning as both a status symbol and a practical necessity for the affluent by allowing for the maintenance of hygiene and comfort in a compact form.

=== The Sheffield era and military standardisation ===
During the 19th century, Sheffield, England, emerged as a primary centre for innovation with the production of "Sheffield contrivances." These pioneering multi-blade pocket knives evolved from complex civilian implements into robust military utility tools.

Prominent manufacturers such as Joseph Rodgers & Sons gained distinction for producing intricate multitools, including the Victorian "Multum in parvo", which contained a dense array of specialised implements like saws, awls and scissors. Such 19th-century sportsman's knives could contain dozens of blades, reflecting the height of Victorian cutlery craftsmanship.

Sheffield manufacturers also produced specialised trade knives, such as the 19th-century coachman’s knife and the Watts Patent cycle knife with integrated tyre levers. One of the most enduring examples from this era is the British Army knife, or clasp knife, which has been manufactured in Sheffield since the mid-1800s and was formally standardised in 1905.

=== The rise of the Swiss Army knife ===
The tradition of military utility was further developed in the late 19th century when Karl Elsener founded Victorinox in Switzerland. In 1891, the company began supplying the Swiss Army with a domestically produced soldier's knife designed to open canned rations and facilitate the maintenance of the Schmidt-Rubin service rifle. The evolution of these knives was meticulously documented in technical journals, noting the transition from carbon steel to stainless steel in 1921.

The Swiss Armed Forces continue to issue such tools to personnel, though modern versions like the Soldier knife 08 feature contemporary materials such as olive-green dual-density scales and one-handed opening blades.

A major milestone in the brand's history occurred in 1897 with the patenting of the officer's and sports knife, which introduced a second blade and a corkscrew held in place by a revolutionary spring mechanism.

=== Hollow handles and interchangeable components ===
Beyond folding knives, another category of multitool involved specialised handles designed to accommodate detachable components. In the mid-19th century, designs emerged utilising hollow handles with split-heads and sliding rings to secure various tool heads such as files and chisels. This mechanical approach provided a rigid grip for heavy-duty tasks whilst remaining portable. A similar concept was utilised by the Millers Falls Company in Millers Falls, Massachusetts, United States. Their tool handle debuted in their first catalogue and eventually became hollow to house different attachments by 1910. Simultaneously, manufacturers like the Bonsa Tool Company in Solingen, Germany, utilised handles with levered catches to secure interchangeable tools. Similar German pocket tool kits often included hammers and pliers that attached to a central locking handle.

=== Modern evolution and the pliers revolution ===
The international profile of the Swiss Army knife was solidified following the Second World War, when the tool was popularised by Allied military personnel. It eventually transitioned from a military implement into a recognised masterpiece of industrial design, earning a place in the permanent collection of the Museum of Modern Art in New York.

The industry underwent its most recent paradigm shift in 1983 when Tim Leatherman introduced a design in the United States centred on folding pliers. This innovation transformed the multitool from a pocketknife with accessories into a heavy-duty portable toolbox.

Modern developments continue to expand the utility of these devices, ranging from task-specific electronic gadgets to extreme examples like the Wenger Giant, which incorporates 87 implements and 141 functions. Collectors often categorise these modern tools by their locking mechanism and frame construction to trace the rapid engineering improvements of the late 20th century.

== Pocket knives ==
Among the earliest contemporary examples is the Swiss Army knife, as supplied by makers Victorinox and Wenger. The actual version supplied to the Swiss army includes a knife blade, a reamer, a bottle-opener–screwdriver–wire stripper, and a can-opener–screwdriver. Besides Victorinox and Wenger, many other manufacturers now make similar knives.

Other versions may include items like a nail file, tweezers, folding scissors, a tooth pick, a magnifying glass, screwdriver bits and others. There are also versions that have special tools for specific sports or outdoor activities like golf, horseback riding, shooting, hunting or fishing. Versions intended for cyclist may have a selection of allen (hex) and torx keys, a selection of wrenches, screwdrivers, tubeless plugs, spoke wrench, and a chain tool.

== Folding multi-tools ==
Leatherman Pocket Survival Tool

In 1983, Tim Leatherman sold his first "Pocket Survival Tool", ⁣ larger and more robust than a pocket-knife-based tool, and incorporating a set of needle-nosed pliers in a butterfly knife-style mechanism.

== Other multi-tools ==
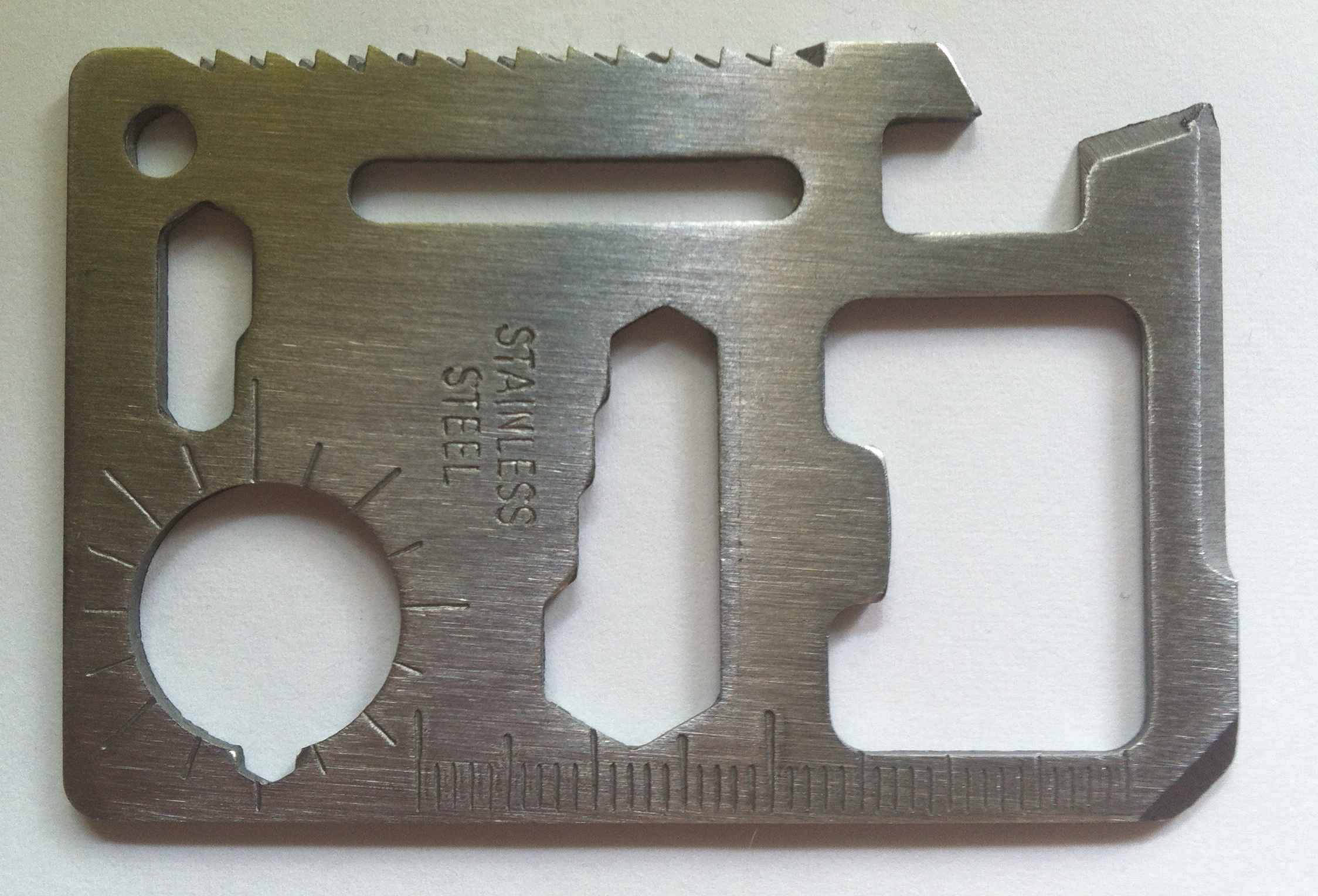
Survival Card

Other multi-tool functions include a hammer, LED light, lighter, tape measure and an assortment of screwdriver bits.

Multifunction tools may be specialized for use in certain activities. Cyclists may carry a folding tool with screwdriver bits or wrenches to allow adjustment of bicycle fasteners during a ride, or for repairing a broken chain. For sport fishermen, a specialized multitool may combine common functions such as cutting fishing line, crimping weights, removing hooks or opening split rings. A specialized multitool may be used for adjustment, cleaning or minor repair of a firearm in field use. Since 2007, the repair of smartphones and electronic devices has become a prominent application for multi-tools. They are also utilized as devices for survival, as it could be used for emergency repairs, escape, creating fire, and even as a tool for first aid application.

== See also ==
- Oscillating multi-tool, a multitool that vibrates back-and-forth and can attach different blades (sometimes associated with the manufacturer Fein)
- Die grinder, a rotary multi-tool (sometimes associated with the manufacturer Dremel)
- Survival knife
