= Multimaster =

Multimaster or multi-master may refer to:

- The Fein Multimaster, a variable speed oscillating cutting tool produced by Fein tools
- Multi-master bus, a computer bus in which there are multiple bus master nodes present on the bus
- Multi-master replication, a method of replication employed by databases to transfer data or changes to data across multiple computers
