= Jig borer =

Machine to very precisely drill, bore and ream holes

The jig borer is a type of machine tool invented at the end of World War I to enable the quick and precise location of hole centers. It was invented independently in Switzerland and the United States. It resembles a specialized kind of milling machine that provides tool and die makers with a higher degree of positioning precision (repeatability) and accuracy than those provided by general machines. Although capable of light milling, a jig borer is more suited to highly accurate drilling, boring, and reaming, where the quill or headstock does not see the significant side loading that it would with mill work. The result is a machine designed more for location accuracy than heavy material removal.

A typical jig borer has a work table of around 400 by 200 millimetres (15.7 in × 7.9 in) which can be moved using large handwheels (with micrometer-style readouts and verniers) on particularly carefully made shafts with a strong degree of gearing; this allows positions to be set on the two axes to an accuracy of 0.0001 inches (2.5 μm). It is generally used to enlarge to a precise size smaller holes drilled with less accurate machinery in approximately the correct place (that is, with the small hole strictly within the area to be bored out for the large hole).

Jig borers are limited to working materials that are still soft enough to be bored. Often a jig is hardened; for a jig borer this requires the material to be bored first and then hardened, which may introduce distortion. Consequently, the jig grinder was developed as a machine with the precision of the jig borer, but capable of working materials in their hardened state.

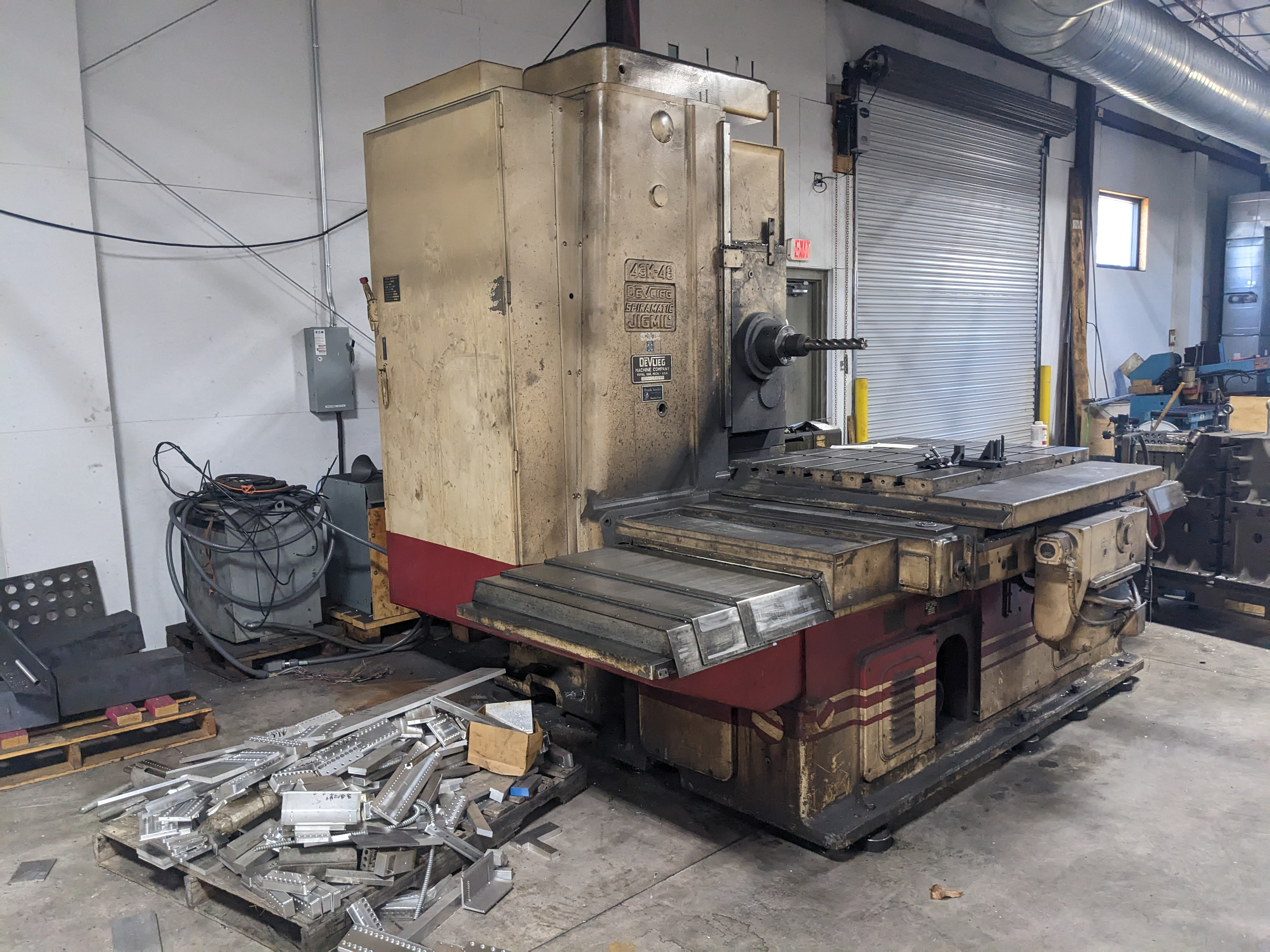
A DeVlieg 43K-48 Jig Mill.

== History ==
Before the jig borer was developed, hole center location had been accomplished either with layout (either quickly-but-imprecisely or painstakingly-and-precisely) or with drill jigs (themselves made with painstaking-and-precise layout). The jig borer was invented to expedite the making of drill jigs, but it helped to eliminate the need for drill jigs entirely by making quick precision directly available for the parts that the jigs would have been created for. The revolutionary underlying principle was that advances in machine tool control that expedited the making of jigs were fundamentally a way to expedite the cutting process itself, for which the jig was just a means to an end. Thus, the jig borer's development helped advance machine tool technology toward later NC and CNC development. The jig borer was a logical extension of manual machine tool technology that began to incorporate some then-novel concepts that would become routine with NC and CNC control, such as:

- coordinate dimensioning (dimensioning of all locations on the part from a single reference point);
- working routinely in "tenths" (ten-thousandths of an inch, 0.0001 inch) as a fast, everyday machine capability (whereas it had been the exclusive domain of special, time-consuming, craftsman-dependent manual skills); and
- circumventing jigs altogether.

Franklin D. Jones, in his textbook Machine Shop Training Course (5th ed), noted:

"In many cases, a jig borer is a 'jig eliminator.' In other words, such a machine may be used instead of a jig either when the quantity of work is not large enough to warrant making a jig or when there is insufficient time for jig making."

Several innovations in the development of the jig borer were the work of the Moore Special Tool Company, such as the adoption of hardened and accurate leadscrews, formed by grinding, rather than a soft leadscrew with a compensating nut.

The technological advances that led to the jig borer and NC were about to usher in the age of CNC and CAD/CAM, radically changing the way people manufacture many of their goods.
