= V-block =

Precision metalworking jig

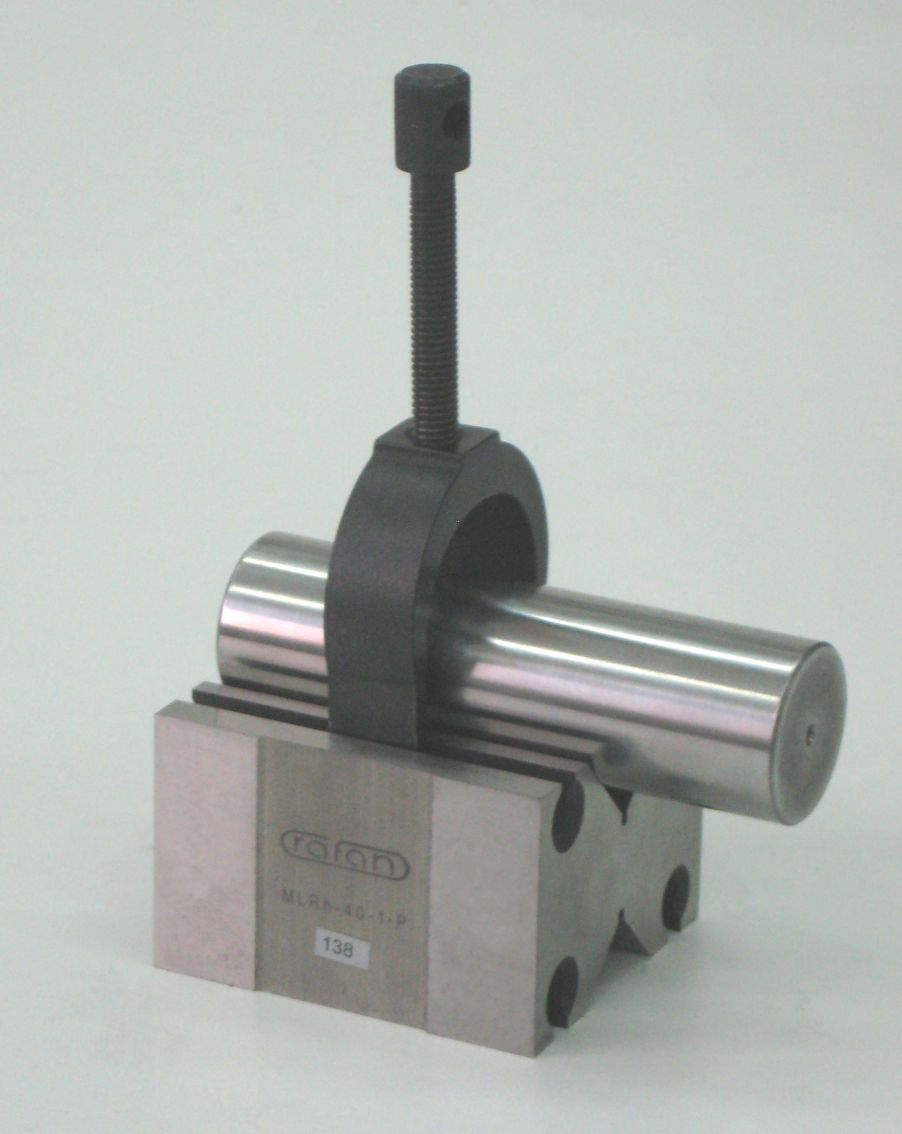

V-blocks are precision metalworking jigs typically used to hold round metal rods or pipes for performing drilling or milling operations. They consist of a rectangular steel or cast iron block with a 90 degree channel rotated 45-degrees from the sides, forming a V-shaped channel in the top. A small groove is cut in the bottom of the "V". They often come with internal magnets or screw clamps to hold the work. V-blocks are usually sold in pairs.
