= Tapering jig =

Woodworking Tool

A tapering jig is a woodworking jig used to cut a workpiece so that its width gradually decreases along its length, producing a taper, typically with the cut running parallel to the grain. Basically a safety harness, the jig turns an imprecise task into a guided operation.

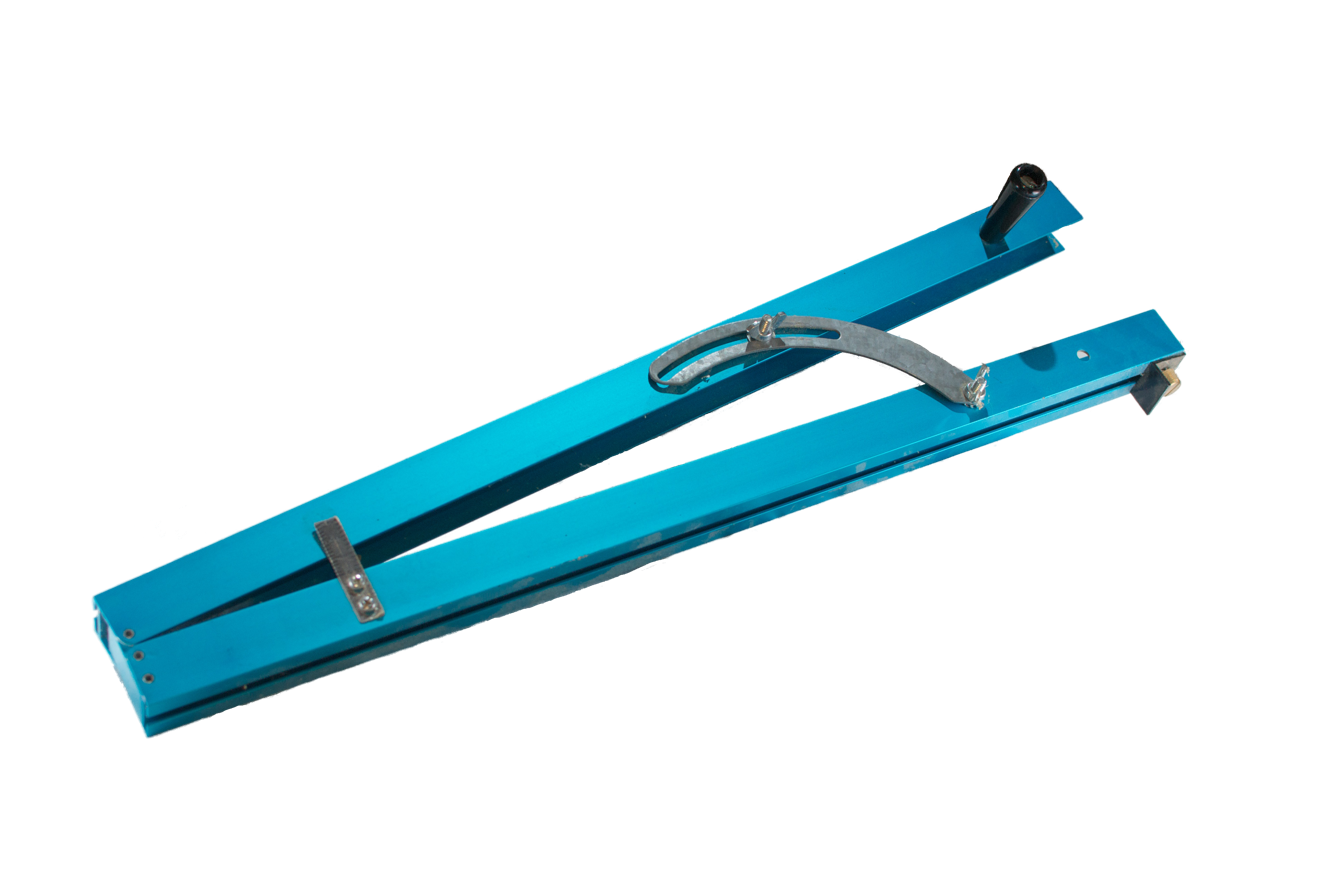
A tapering jig

Tapering jigs are often used to create table legs, with the taper usually cut into the two sides of the leg facing the inside of the table. There are various commercial varieties of tapering jigs, ranging for simple two hinged pieces of aluminum square tubing with a device to maintain angle settings, to more complex varieties that utilize clamps to affix the workpiece to a bed using toggle clamps or other clamping devices.

Many woodworkers prefer to make a shop jigs optimized for the particular project at hand.

== Patents ==
Taper jig and methods of use
adjustable tracks and measurement assemblies designed to guide and clamp a workpiece at precise angled settings for tapered cuts.
Apparatus for taper cutting square workpieces
discusses improvements in taper cutting jigs and sled‑type setups.
Adjustable taper ripping jig
an older design still referenced in later taper jig patents

== See also ==
- Jig (tool)
- Staircase jig
- Sharpening jig
