= Rotary tool =

Handheld power tool

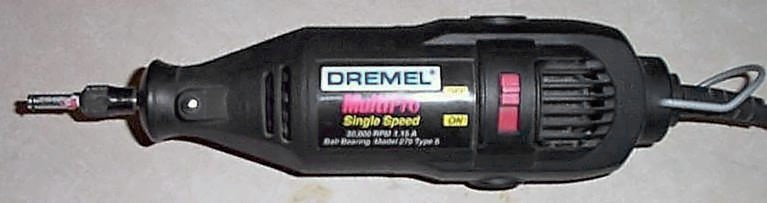
Dremel rotary tool used for multiple tasks

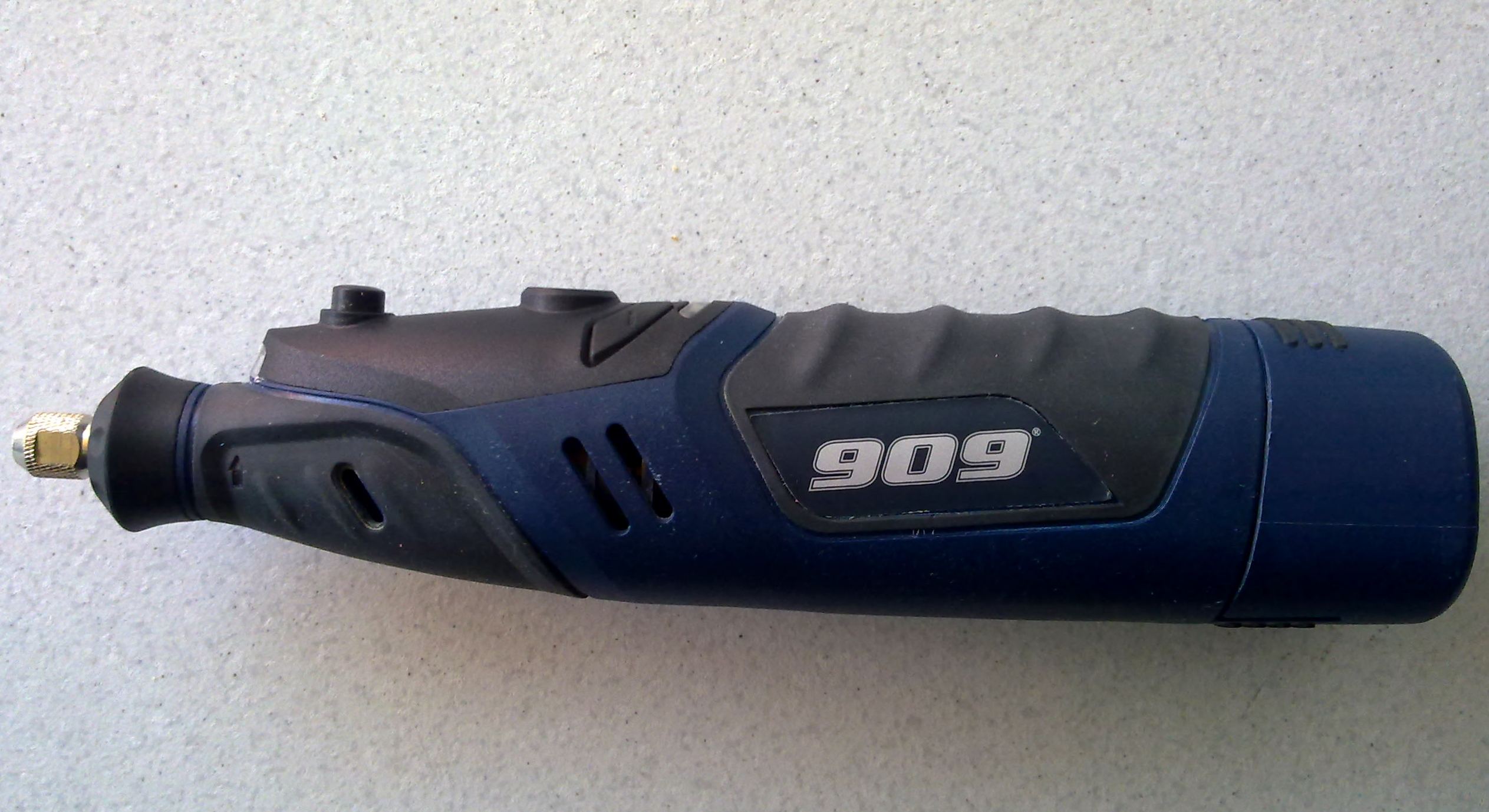
A cordless battery-powered rotary tool used for light tasks.

A die grinder or rotary tool is a handheld power tool and multitool used for grinding, sanding, honing, polishing, or machining material (typically metal, but also plastic or wood). All such tools are conceptually similar, with no bright dividing line between die grinders and rotary tools, although the die grinder name tends to be used for pneumatically driven heavy-duty versions whereas the rotary tool name tends to be used for electric lighter-duty versions. Flexible shaft drive versions also exist.

== Mechanism ==
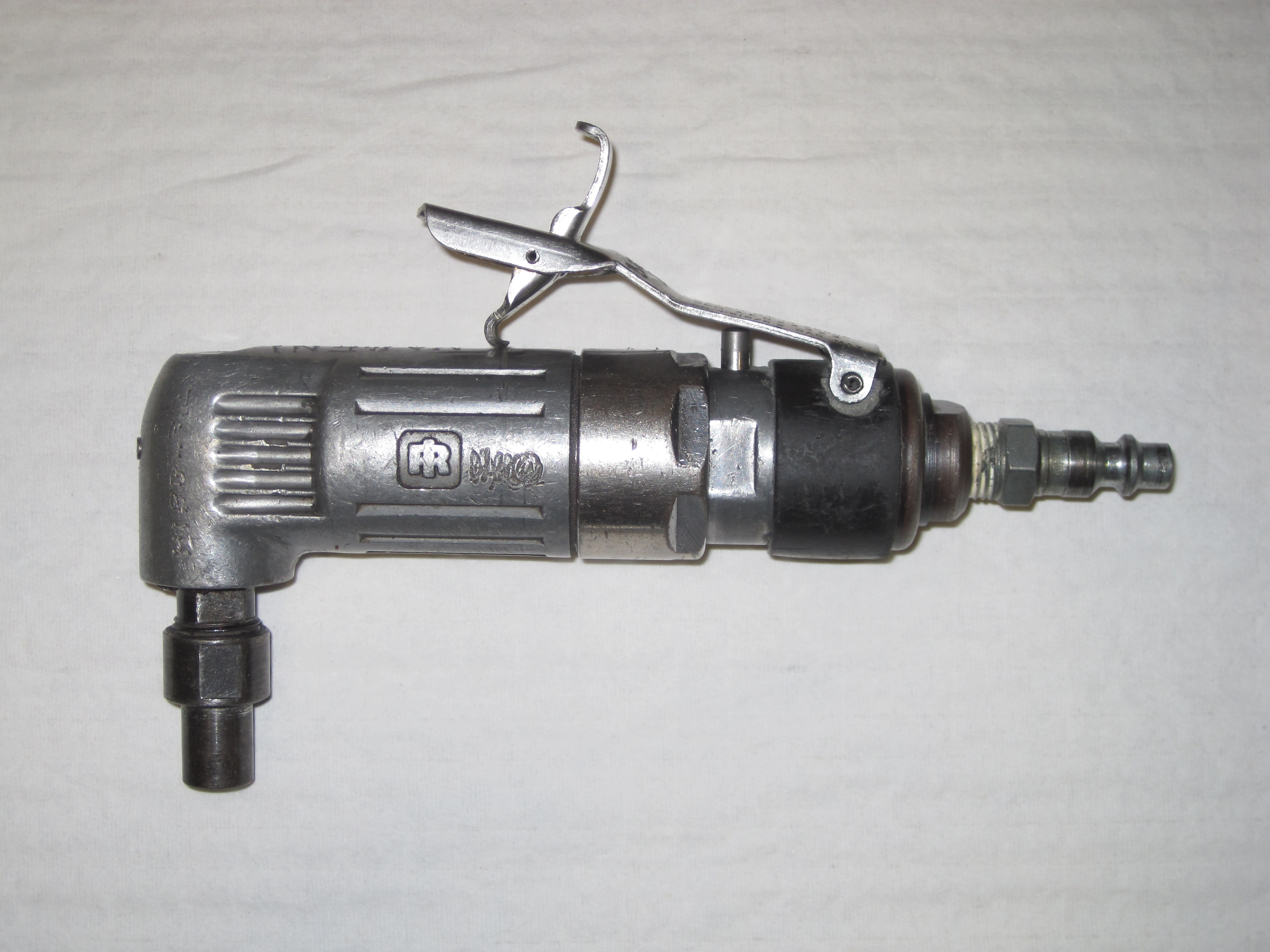
A pneumatic die grinder with a right-angle head

The cutting may be done in various ways, including:

- Grinding with bonded abrasive stones (called by various names, such as mounted stones, mounted points, or grinding points)
- Machining with a burr or small drill bit or endmill
- Sanding with coated abrasive, such as small drums made of sandpaper mounted on an expanding rubber mandrel (also called an arbor)
- Honing with fine-grit mounted points
- Lapping with lapping compound and a mounted lap to embed it
- Polishing or buffing with cloth or fiber drums or flaps and polishing compound

The cutter is usually held in a collet, which is a convenient means of chucking in this application and provides the concentricity needed for high-RPM use. It also allows for quick changes in cutters. In some applications, other quick-change indexable chucking systems can be used, similar to the indexable chucking types now commonly found on consumer pistol-grip drills.

== Types ==
- Mounted stones of many shapes and various [small or medium] sizes (also called mounted points or grinding points)
- Burrs of many shapes and various [small or medium] sizes (also called rotary files)
- Small drill bits
- Small endmills
- Small disc-shaped saw blades or milling cutters
- Small abrasive cut-off wheels, which work like saw blades except via abrasive cutting rather than sawing per se
- Small sanding drums
- Small sanding flap wheels
- Small cloth or fiber wheels, drums, and flap wheels (for holding polishing compound)
- Mounted laps

== Uses ==
The die grinder name comes from one of their earliest and archetypal applications, tool and die work, where they were used to create the precise contours of dies or molds. Especially before the advent of widespread CNC usage, they were heavily relied upon for contouring via manual skill comparable to a sculptor's. CNC now provides much of the contouring for die and mold interior surfaces, but die grinders are still very useful for hundreds of cutting needs, from sculpture-like contouring in the absence of CNC, to cut-off of bar stock, to any of the cutting and grinding needs of fabrication, such as in the work of welders, boilermakers, millwrights, ironworkers (steel erectors), sheet metal workers (such as auto body workers and HVAC technicians), to woodworking (especially cabinet making), hacking, and other hobby or business pursuits. Die grinders are often used for engraving, cylinder head porting, and general shaping of a part.

== See also ==
- Dremel
- Multi-tool (power tool)
