= Tool and die maker =

Class of machinist in manufacturing

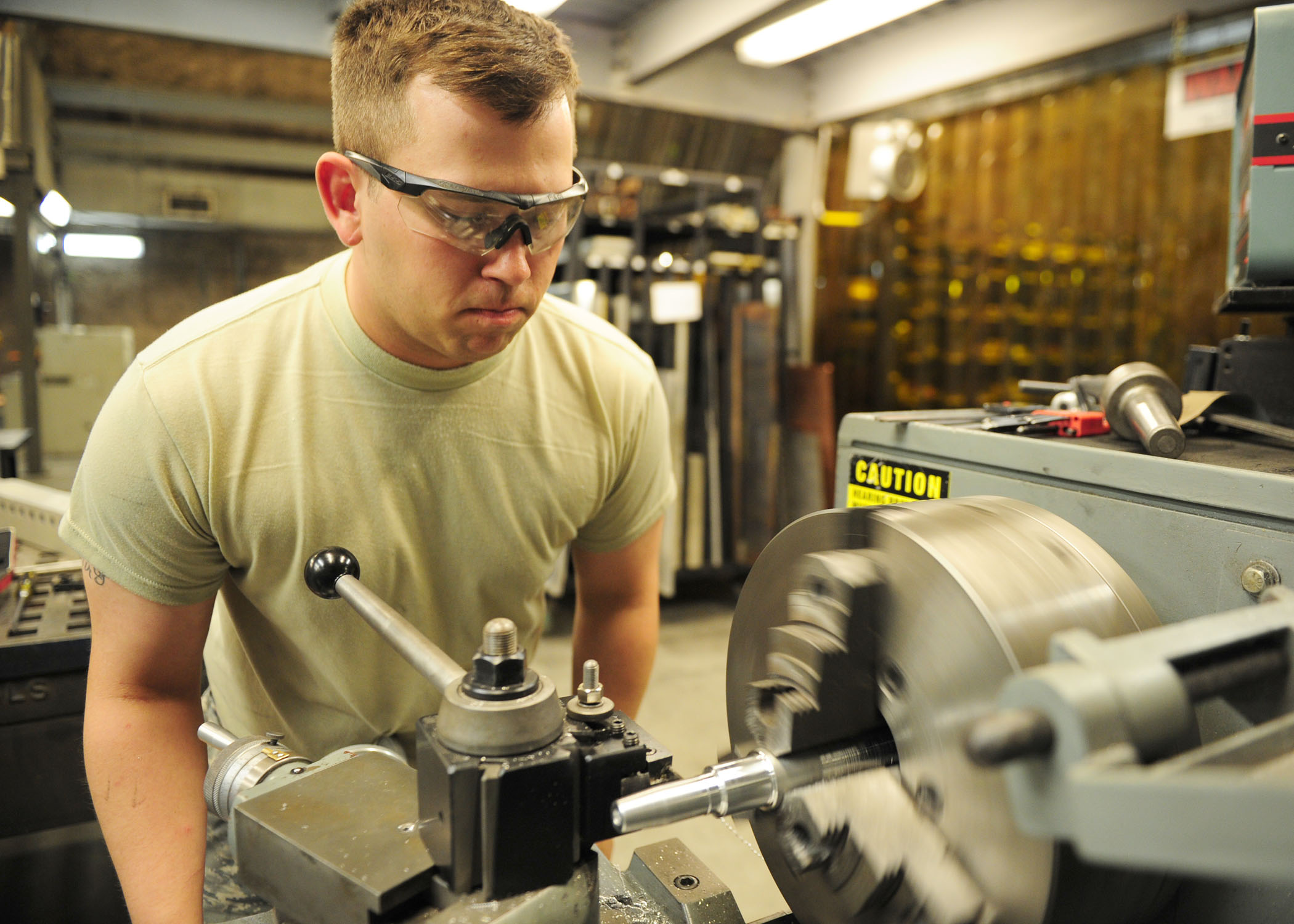
A machinist at a lathe

Tool and die makers are highly skilled crafters working in the manufacturing industries. (Note: Variations on the name include tool maker (or toolmaker), die maker (or diemaker), or tool jig and die-maker depending on which area of concentration or industry an individual works in; mold maker (or moldmaker) is a closely related occupation.) Tool and die makers work primarily in toolroom environments—sometimes literally in one room but more often in an environment with flexible, semipermeable boundaries from production work. They are skilled artisans (craftspeople) who typically learn their trade through a combination of academic coursework and with substantial period of on-the-job training that is functionally an apprenticeship. They make jigs, fixtures, dies, molds, machine tools, cutting tools, gauges, and other tools used in manufacturing processes.

== Divisions ==
The main divisions of the tool & die industry include:

- Die casting
- Dies
- Fixtures
- Forging
- Gauges
- Jigs
- Metalworking
- Moulding

== Job description ==
Working from engineering drawings developed by the toolmaker, engineers or technologists, tool makers lay out the design on the raw material (usually metal), then cut it to size and shape using manually controlled machine tools (such as lathes, milling machines, grinding machines, and jig grinders), power tools (such as die grinders and rotary tools), and hand tools (such as files and honing stones).

Art and science (specifically, applied science) are thoroughly intermixed in their work, since they're also in engineering. Manufacturing engineers and tool and die makers often work in close consultation as part of a manufacturing engineering team. There is often turnover between the careers, as one person may end up working in both at different times of their life, depending on the turns of their particular educational and career path. There was no codified difference between them during the 19th century and earlier parts of the 20th century; it was only after World War II that engineering became a regulated profession exclusively defined by a university or college engineering degree. Both careers require some level of talent in both artistic/artisanal/creative areas and math-and-science areas.

Since the advent of computing in the manufacturing fields (including CNC, CAD, CAM, and other computer-aided technologies), tool and die makers have increasingly added IT skills to their daily work. Today's tool and die makers are generally required to have all of the traditional skills plus substantial digital skills; these formidable requirements make the field challenging to master.

== Training ==
Although the details of training programs vary, many tool and die makers begin an apprenticeship with an employer, possibly including a mix of classroom training and hands-on experience. Some prior qualifications in basic mathematics, science, engineering science or design and technology can be valuable. Many tool and die makers attend a 4- to 5-year apprenticeship program to achieve the status of a journeyman tool and die maker. Today's employment relationships often differ in name and detail from the traditional arrangement of an apprenticeship, and the terms "apprentice" and "journeyman" are not always used, but the idea of a period of years of on-the-job training leading to mastery of the field still applies.

In the United States, tool and die makers who graduate from NTMA (National Tooling and Machining Association) have gone through 4 years of college courses as well as 10,000 working hours in order to complete their apprenticeship. They are also accredited through the U.S. Department of Labor.

== Jig/fixture maker ==
A jig and fixture maker is under the faction of a tool and die maker/toolmaker. The standard differentiation of jigs from fixtures is that a jig guides the tool for the operation being carried out while a fixture simply secures the work. The terms are sometimes used interchangeably. A jig and fixture maker needs to know how to use an assortment of machines to build these devices such as having skills in welding and in some cases the knowledge of wood working equipment, of course with the tool room machining skills.

They are often advised by an engineer in building the devices. A wide knowledge of various materials is needed beyond wood and metal such as plastics. They also can create, design and build without engineering plans/blueprints.

Jig/fixture makers gain hands on practical experience while monitoring and making alterations as the manufacturing process is constantly improved and reviewed with/by engineering. They also can be required to make these adjustments without engineering help, depending on the size of the company. Some Jigs and fixtures require electronic and pneumatic actuation, which will involve knowledge/training in these fields as well.

Properly built jigs and fixtures reduce waste by ensuring perfectly fitting parts. Jigs and fixtures can be as big as a car or be held in hand. Production needs dictate form and function. Jigs, fixtures and gages are needed to maintain quality standards for repeated low and high volume production demands.

Ongoing evolution of computerized design and control technologies, such as CAD/CAM, CNC, PLC, and others, has limited the use of jigs in manufacturing, however all the computer run machines need some sort of clamping fixture for production runs. A common example is that a drill jig is not needed to guide the drill bits to the hole centers if it is done on a CNC, since it is Computer Numerically Controlled. However, fixtures are still needed to hold the part[s] in place for the operation needed. Jigs are currently needed in many areas of manufacturing but mainly for low-volume production.

== Terminology ==
=== Die making ===
Die making is a subdiscipline of tool making that focuses on making and maintaining dies. This often includes making punches, dies, steel rule dies, and die sets. Precision is essential in die making; punches and die steels must maintain proper clearance to produce parts accurately, and it is often necessary to have components machined with tolerances of less than one thousandth of an inch.

=== Tool making ===
Tool making typically means making tooling used to produce products. Common tooling includes metal forming rolls, cutting tools (such as tool bits and milling cutters), fixtures, or even whole machine tools used to manufacture, hold, or test products during their fabrication. Due to the unique nature of a tool maker's work, it is often necessary to fabricate custom tools or modify standard tools.

=== Overlap of die making, tool making, and mold making ===
One person may be called upon for all of the above activities, and the skills and concepts involved overlap, which is why tool and die making is often viewed as one field and is also why mold making is often viewed as a subset thereof (rather than a totally separate field).

=== Toolrooms and toolroom methods ===
A toolroom in the original sense of the word is a room where tools are stored; a tool crib. In larger companies, the tools stored there must be checked in and out, and there may be a person assigned to attend the area. In a factory, the toolroom refers to a space where artifacts are made and repaired, particularly tools for use throughout the rest of the factory, jigs for setups, and other parts to assist workers and, as an extension, production. In engineering and manufacturing, toolroom activity is everything related to tool-and-die facilities in contrast to production line activity.

Originally a toolroom was literally in one room, but like emergency room, the term has been figuratively extended in both substantive and adjectival senses to all such places and the methods used there, regardless of the physical space. The name was originally styled tool room or tool-room, but toolroom is now the norm in engineering and machining.

==== Making, repairing, and storing tools ====
The simplest sense of the word toolroom refers to the storage of tools. A broader use of the term includes reference to a space where tools are made, repaired, inventoried, and/or distributed for use within the factory. This extension of the latter sense reflects the development of greater systemization in manufacturing. During the 19th century, there gradually developed a division of labor whereby the people who made, repaired, kept records of, stored, and retrieved tools were not necessarily the same people who used the tools to do the manufacturing work itself. Examples of such division of labor had existed in prior centuries, but most manufacturing had been done on a craft basis, where there had been no need for the idea of a toolroom separate from the rest of the workshop.

The simplest sense above can also be conveyed by the word toolcrib (sometimes styled tool-crib or tool crib).

==== Tool-and-die facilities and methods ====
In engineering and manufacturing, a toolroom is everything related to tool-and-die facilities and methods, in contrast to the factory floor and production line activity. For people not familiar with these fields, in order to understand the specialist usage, some explanation is needed:

Within the general field of machining there is a rough but recurring division between (a) toolroom practice and (b) production practice (the making of large numbers of duplicate parts). It is the difference between manufacturing itself and the tool-and-die work that is done in support of the manufacturing. Anecdotal examples of similar distinctions can probably be found here and there throughout human history, but as a widespread part of the "fabric" of material culture, this distinction (and the terminology with which to talk about it) has evolved since the Industrial Revolution, and most especially since the advent of armory practice and later mass production.

A good, simplistic way to summarize the change in ideas is to compare the making of a certain product in different time periods. In 1750, a rifle was made in a workshop by a craftsman using hand tools, and if he needed a new tool, it is likely that he would make it himself using the same tools and methods that he would use to make his product, the rifle (smithy, files, woodcarving knives, etc.) This type of craftsmanship can still be done today, but it is expensive in terms of skilled labor time per unit of output, and therefore it implies small total output volume and high unit price. However, today the way to make rifles in large quantity with low unit price is to first do the tool-and-die work (toolroom work) (that is, make, or have someone else make, machine tools, jigs, and fixtures), and then use those specialized tools to mass-produce the rifles in an automated way that involves no toolroom methods.

Another example, instead of comparing different centuries, simply compares different methods of toolpath control that could be chosen today: If you need a certain hole location on each part for your drill bit, will you dial it carefully by hand many times (once for each part produced), or will you dial it carefully by hand only once—while making a drill jig for subsequent drilling to be quickly and effortlessly guided by?

The manufacturing of small batches has often presented the biggest challenge to this division of methods. When only a small batch of output is demanded, will one (a) produce each piece using "custom" methods (handcrafting or toolroom-style layout and machining), which drives up unit cost; or (b) maintain the capital-cost-intensive toolroom-production division, which also drives up unit costs in its own ways? In other words, is it worth one's time to make a fixture, and is it worth tying up a drill press's availability by setting it up for dedicated use with that fixture? The drill press may be needed tomorrow for a different part, with a different setup. For 100 parts, the costs of making a fixture and tying up a machine's availability are justified. For 5 parts, maybe one should just make each of the 5 using toolroom-style layout and toolpath control.

The evolution of IT and its integration into manufacturing is changing the questions and equations still further. For example, CNC and robotics have led the way to rapid prototyping and instant manufacturing, which shift the toolroom-production division by giving an up-front toolroom investment the flexibility to be quickly and easily used for any product design, with batch size irrelevant.

In large corporations there may be a very distinct division of labor between toolroom work and production machining, with different employees for each, whereas job-shop work is often a blend of toolroom work and production work, because each project requires some of both, and the same employees may "wear each hat" in sequence.

== See also ==
- Machinist – Skilled operator of machine tools
- category:machine tool builders
- Tap and die – Tools to create screw threads
