= Staircase jig =

Woodworking tool

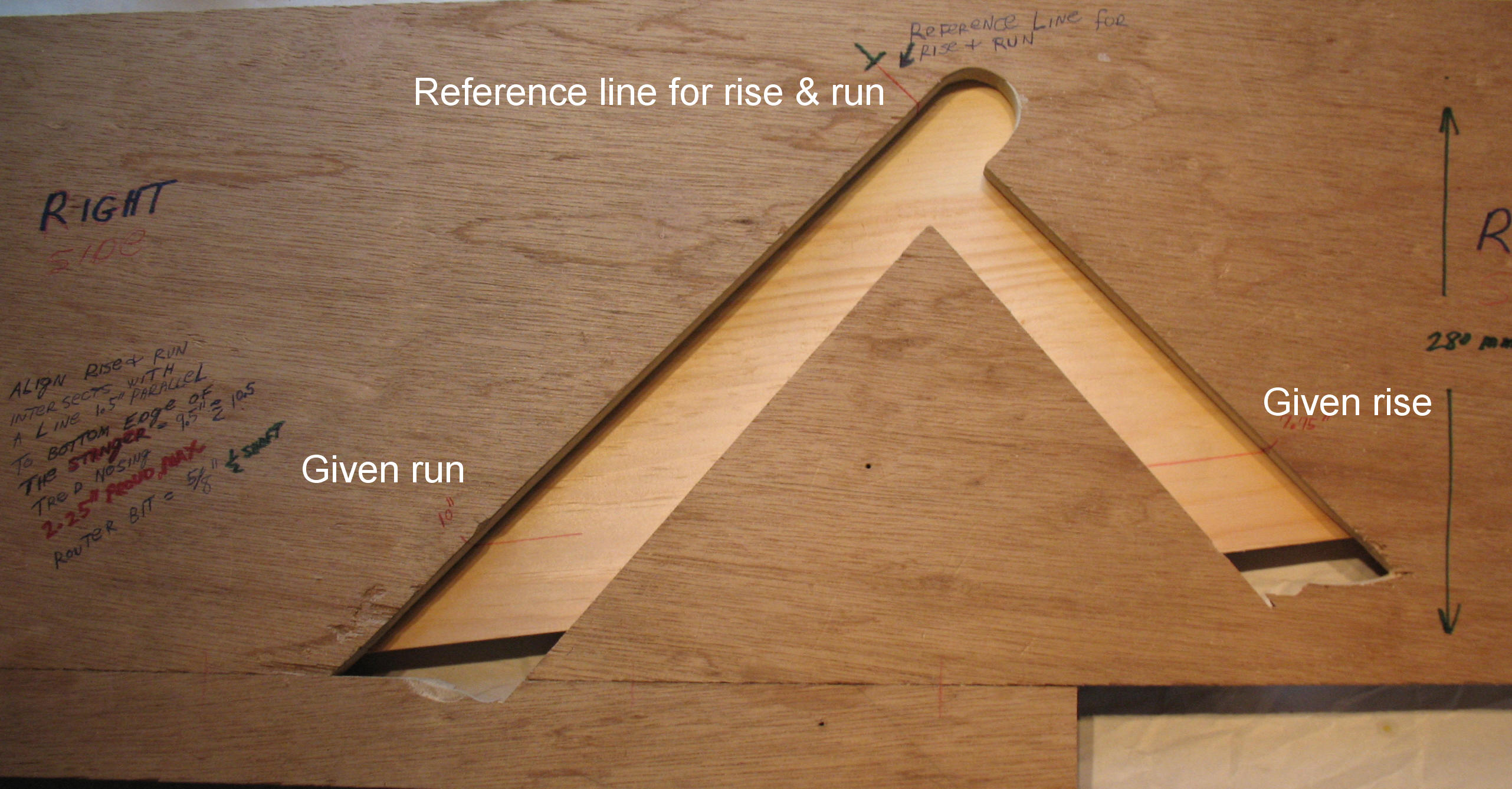
A staircase jig

A staircase jig is a woodworking tool that incorporates both a right angle and an acute angle in its design. The jig is easily transported due to its small size and light weight. Precise measurements are required to layout the diagonal locations.

This jig uses a zero reference line from which the rise and tread are measured. The upper part of the jig is a right triangle with a roundover overhang. The template allows for a tight fit of the tread into the stringer in the overhang section. The bottom of the jig incorporates an acute angle. This tapered angle allows a space for a wedge to fit against the back side of the vertical and the horizontal plane of the stringer. This jig can be used to lay out different rise (vertical) and tread (horizontal) widths. The jig is used with a plunge router and a bushing guide. The router plows out a precise groove into the finished product that allows all the parts to fit together.

== Uses of jig ==
The jig is used to make finish stringers, in interior staircase fabrication. The stringer is also referred to as a skirtboard. It can be used in a closed staircase or an open staircase where one side of the staircase is exposed, and the other is housed into the skirtboard.

== Design of jigs ==
The jig in the image is designed to cut only one segment of the stringer at a time. Some industrial staircase jigs are designed to cut out an entire stringer in one setup. There are jigs to cut dovetails, mortise & tenon joints, box joints, keyed miters, finger joints, bridle joints, scarf joints, and many other joints. All these jigs are designed to add precision, consistency, and productivity to a job.

== See also ==
- Sharpening jig
- Tapering jig
