= Oscillating multi-tool =

Power tool which works by oscillation

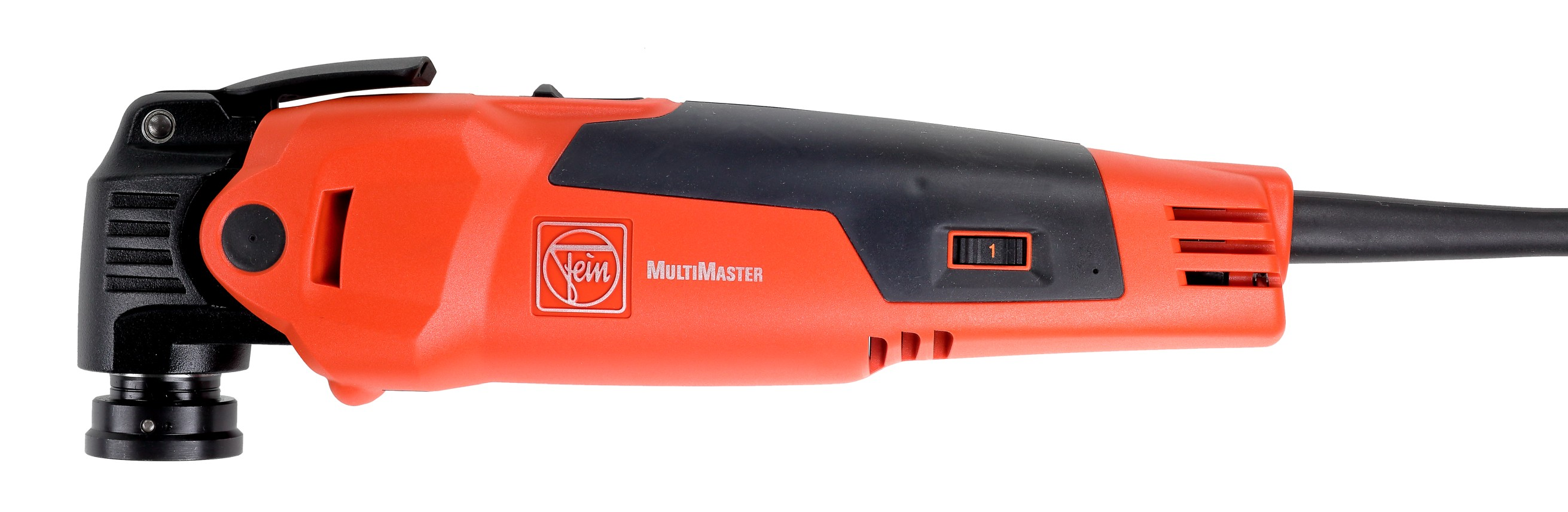
Fein Multimaster without blade attached

An oscillating multi-tool or oscillating saw is a multitool and power tool that oscillates (rather than rotating or reciprocating), powered by battery or mains. The name "multi-tool" is a reference to the many functions that this tool can perform with the range of attachments available. "Master Tool" is also a trade name used in North America, short for the original tool by Fein called the Multi-Master. Attachments are available for sawing, sanding, rasping, grinding, scraping, cutting, and polishing.

== History ==
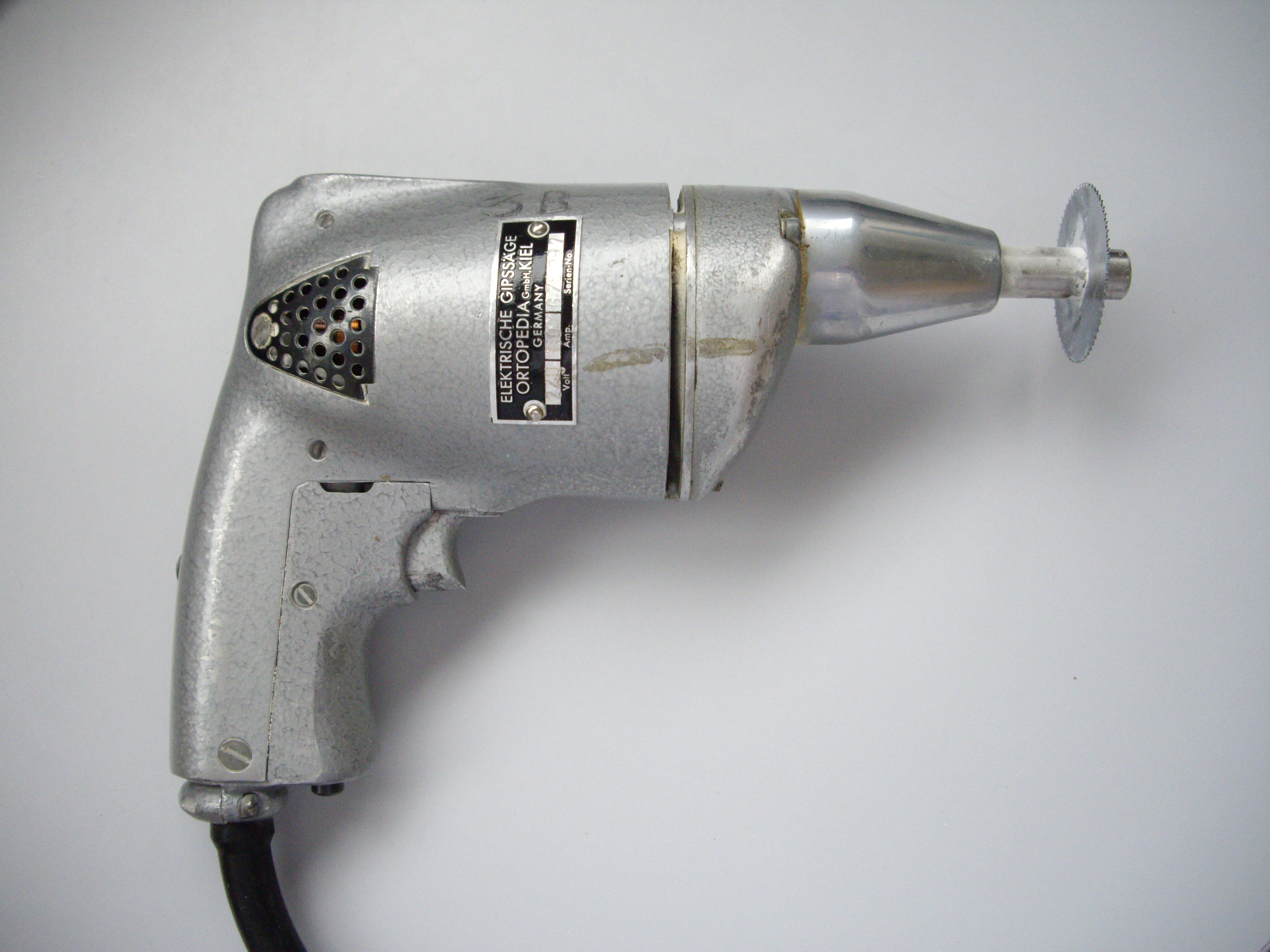
Elektrische Gipssäge, a cast saw by Ortopedia (Kiel, Germany), is a power tool used to remove orthopedic casts which has an oscillating blade instead of a circular saw with a rotating blade

This type of oscillating tool was originally developed by the German manufacturer Fein in 1967 with a design intended to remove plaster casts easily without cutting the patient.

This saw was patented as a circular saw with an angular oscillating saw blade. It was used primarily in orthopaedics for cutting plaster casts. The crescent pattern of the oscillating rotation cut through the hard cast without damaging the patient’s skin. The plaster cast saw was equipped with a more powerful gearbox to upgrade it to a chassis saw. The plaster cast saw formed the basis of FEIN's range of oscillating power tools.

== Uses ==
Use of an offset in a fitted blade allows the tool to cut flush with a surface. This is particularly useful when fitting flooring along a skirting board, cutting the skirting to allow the board to slide under for a neat finish. The small form of these tools and the ability to mount the blade or accessory in any orientation allows cutting in areas that are otherwise virtually unreachable. The ability to cut a complex or precise recess without the need to remove the work piece from where is it fixed greatly increases productivity. Small and precise cuts are possible even on end grain. A small sliver can be easily removed from timber cut too long for a perfect fit.

The accessory is fitted to the tool by a mechanism which allows that accessory to be rapidly rotated back and forth (oscillated). This creates friction with the sanding attachments, or rapid cutting motions with the saw and grinding attachments. The narrow angle of oscillation allows for precise control over the tool as it does not kick like a rotating or reciprocating tool can. The angle of oscillation creates increasing friction further from the center of the tool as these areas travel a greater distance. The increased friction is particularly apparent with the triangular sanding and grinding attachments which allow the operator to reach into corners and confined spaces, a feature unique to this type of power tool. The saw blade attachments use the angle of oscillation in the same way, particularly the circular-shaped saw used in hospitals to cut the orthopedic plaster used in cases of bone fracture, once the immobilization time is over.

The oscillating blade does not clear swarf in the same way as a rotating blade, so it is necessary to move the tool back and forth to allow accumulated sawdust to clear from the cutting area. Improvements in battery technology such as lithium-ion battery have allowed for tools which can be small in size and weight but still perform well enough to compete with mains-powered equivalents while freeing the user from the restrictions of cables.

== Blades and accessories ==
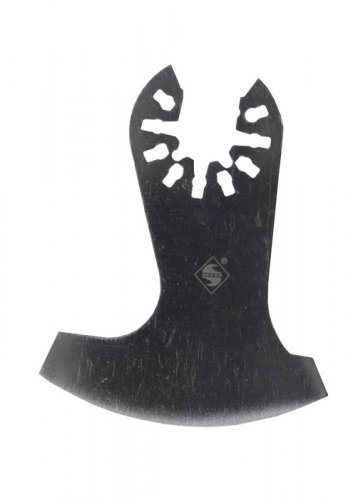
A non-symmetric scraper blade for an oscillating power tool

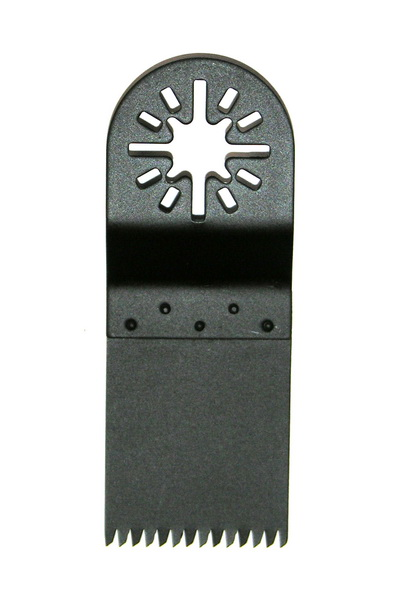
Saw blade for an oscillating power tool

Various attachments and blades are on the market, giving these machines a wide variety of uses. The blades can be separated into 5 main categories: cutting; tile, grout and masonry; sanding; scraping; and polishing.

Cutting blades are standard saw blades with various tooth configurations for cutting different material. They are either straight blades with the teeth on the end, allowing the user to "plunge cut" directly into the material they are cutting, or circular blades. Bi-metal blades offer smaller hardened teeth that allow the user to cut soft metals and the popular Japan tooth blades have large teeth that cut wood quickly but cannot cut metal

Tile, grout, and masonry attachments are either carbide or diamond coated and allow the user to clear grout between tiles or do light masonry work.

Standard sanding attachments allow the user to sand flat surfaces and specialty attachments such as the profile sanding kit allow detailed profile sanding work to be done.

Polishing is possible with the help of polishing pad attachments that are becoming more popular.

The arbor attachment on all machines has varied widely since these machines started production, with many machines using a proprietary arbor configuration. Many after-market blade companies have created universal arbor attachments that are compatible with most, but not all, oscillating multi-tool machines.

The Starlock interface was launched by tool manufacturer Robert Bosch GmbH and Fein. The interface is compatible with a number of other manufacturers.

== Alternatives ==
An oscillating saw can perform some of the same tasks as a jigsaw. One can also perform some of the same operations as one otherwise would have done with a chisel and hammer, possibly in combination with a drill.

== See also ==
- Fein Multimaster RS, a well known oscillating multitool whose patent expired in 2008
- Cast saw, an oscillating power tool used to remove orthopedic casts
- Die grinder, a rotary multi-tool (sometimes associated with the manufacturer Dremel)
