= Wilhelm Emil Fein =

German inventor (1842–1898)

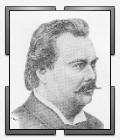
- Born: 16 January 1842; Ludwigsburg, Kingdom of Württemberg
- Died: 6 October 1898 (aged 56); Stuttgart, capital of the Kingdom of Württemberg, Germany
- Occupation: Inventor

Wilhelm Emil Fein (16 January 1842 – 6 October 1898) was a German inventor. He invented the worldwide first portable telephone (1885) and the worldwide first portable electric drill (1895).

== Life ==
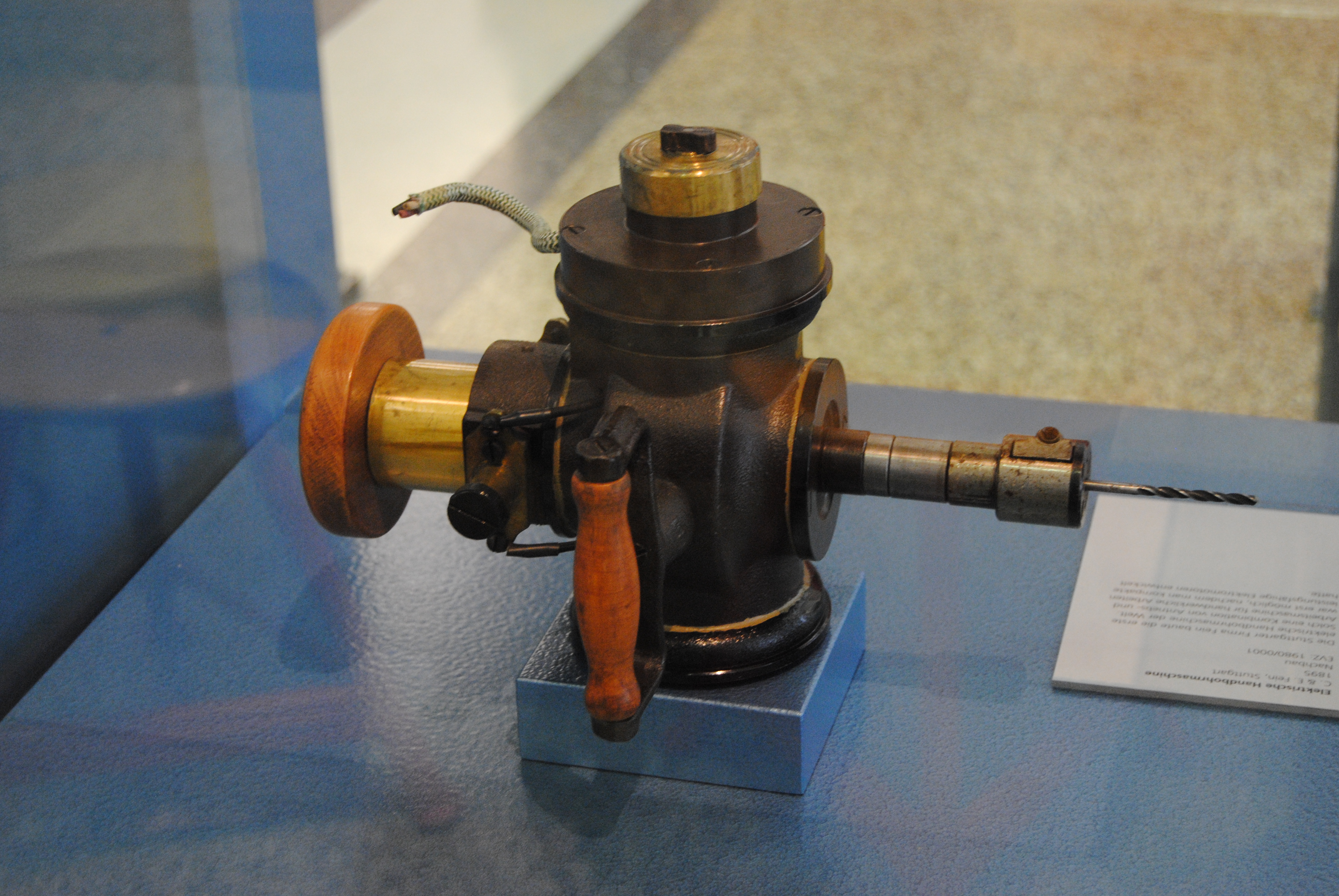
early Fein portable electric drill

In 1867, he and his brother Carl founded their own company. Amongst other inventions, he invented an electric motor for machine tools.

== Works by Fein ==
- Elektrische Apparate, Maschinen und Einrichtungen

== Awards ==
- 1891: Württembergische Staatsmedaille für Kunst und Wissenschaft
