= Sharpening jig =

Tool used to sharpen woodworking tools

A sharpening jig is often used when sharpening woodworking tools. Many of the tools used in woodworking have steel blades which are sharpened to a fine edge. A cutting edge is created on the blade at the point at which two surfaces of the blade meet. To create this cutting edge a bevel is formed on the blade, usually by grinding. This bevel is subsequently refined by honing until a satisfactorily sharp edge is created.

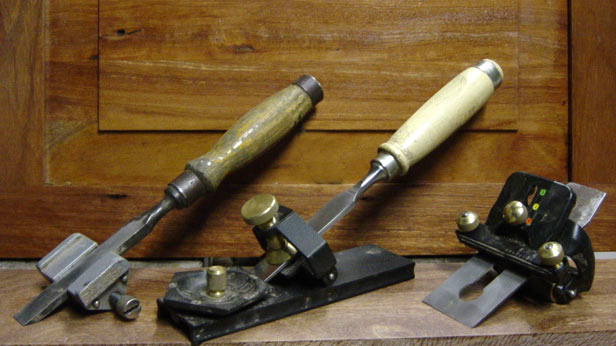
Push style sharpening jigs used to sharpen chisels and plane blades

The purpose of the sharpening jig is to hold the blade or tool at the desired angle while grinding or honing the bevel. In some cases, the angle of the bevel is critical to the performance of the cutting edge—a jig allows for repeatability of this angle over a number of sharpening sessions.

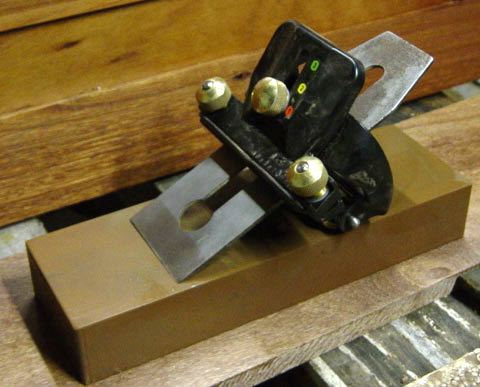
A push style sharpening jig being used to sharpen a plane iron on a water stone

There are many styles of jig available commercially. Fundamentally, all jigs are similar in that they allow the user to clamp the blade or tool in some way. The jig then has some means of referencing the clamped blade to the grinding or honing apparatus so that the bevel angle is maintained. One of the more common approaches is to have the jig ride on a roller. These types of jigs are usually used with a sharpening stone or plate, such as a waterstone, oilstone or diamond abrasive surface. Other types of jigs are used to present the blade to the wheel of a grinder. There are generally two types of hand sharpening jigs, push jigs and side-to-side jigs. Push jigs run perpendicular to the length of the stone and a side-to-side jig runs with the blade parallel to the length of the stone.

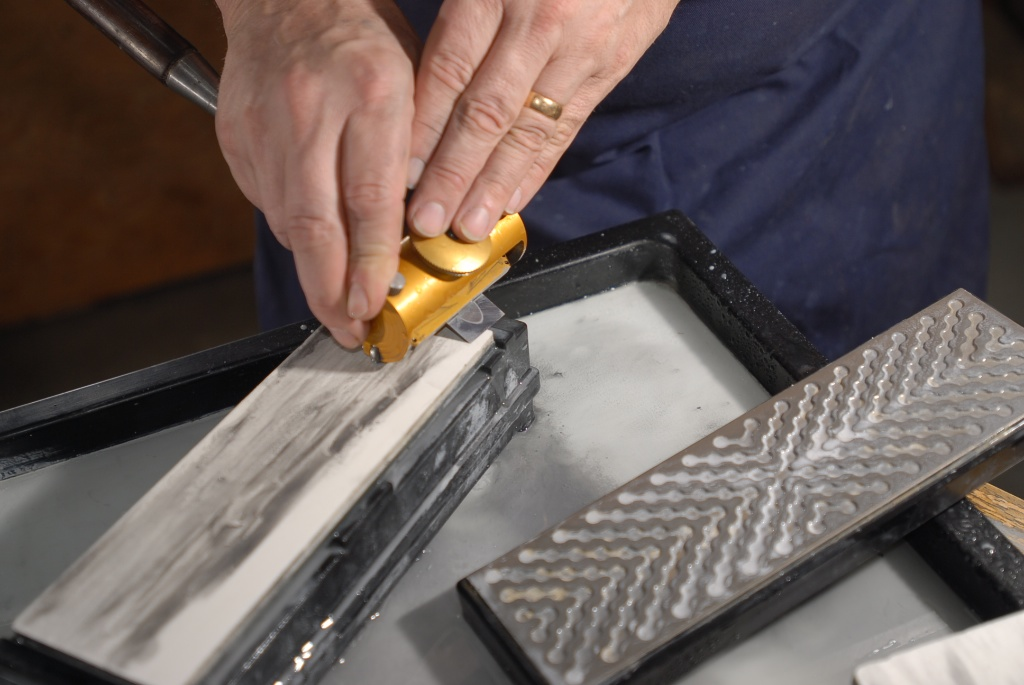
A side to side jig

Many woodworkers prefer to learn the technique of sharpening by hand. This method does not require a jig, but requires a lot of practice to achieve satisfactory results – especially in situations where the bevel angle is critical.

== See also ==
- Jig (tool)
- Staircase jig
- Tapering jig
