= Jig grinder =

A Moore jig grinder. Wrenches, 1-2-3 blocks, and other tools are resting on the X-Y table.

A jig grinder is a machine tool used for grinding complex shapes and holes where the highest degrees of accuracy and finish are required.

The jig grinder is very similar to a jig borer, in that the table positioning and spindles are very accurate (far more so than a manual milling machine or lathe). It is used almost exclusively by tool and die makers in the creation of jigs or mating holes and pegs on dies. There are usually many peripheral elements to a large jig grinder, including separate hydraulic motors, air compressors, and various cooling systems for both the hydraulic circuit and supplying coolant to the work and machine itself.

The machine operates by a high-speed air spindle rotating a grinding bit. The air spindles are removable and interchangeable to achieve varying surface speeds. Some spindles are fixed speed (such as at 60,000 rpm), others are adjustable (such as from 30,000 to 50,000 rpm), and still others are very high speed (such as at 175,000 rpm). The machines have a standard X-Y table with the notable exception of knee travel. All axes are indexed to an accuracy resembling 0.0001" (0.00254 mm) via a vernier scale on the handwheels, with higher accuracy available with the use of measuring bars. The machine head has two vertical travels, one for rough head adjustment and the other for precise spindle adjustment. To change the diameter of the hole to be ground, the air spindle can be offset from the axis of the rotary head by a slide in a similar manner to a boring head for a milling machine, allowing a hole of any size to be ground with the same tooling (up to the machine's capacity). This offset can be adjusted while running and can typically outfeed about 0.100" (2.54 mm), again with an accuracy of 0.0001" (0.00254 mm) on the handwheel or greater, for very precise hole, peg, and surface grinding. A well-kept jig grinder will reliably position work to a higher degree of accuracy than is possible with handwheels alone. These features are all critical in positioning a hole-and-peg system a precise distance from a reference surface or edge.

The most important factor on a jig grinder is the dual-spindle configuration. The main spindle is roughly positioned with between 1" or 2" of travel for setup, and then the 0.100" (2.54 mm) of outfeed is used during machine operation to outfeed into the work. A spacer bar may be used between the grinder and main spindle, allowing large (9" radius or larger) work to be completed. The main spindle has a wide range of speeds to ensure proper grinder feed rates are maintained.

On October 19, 2022, the United States Department of Justice charged four individuals and two companies with violating U.S. export laws by attempting to smuggle a jig grinder, which is a dual use, export-controlled item, to Russia.

== Sources ==
- Venkatesh, Izman; Venkatesh, V.C. (2007). Precision Engineering (Illustrated ed.). Tata McGraw-Hill Education.
