= Jig (tool) =

Custom-made tool used to control the location or motion of another tool

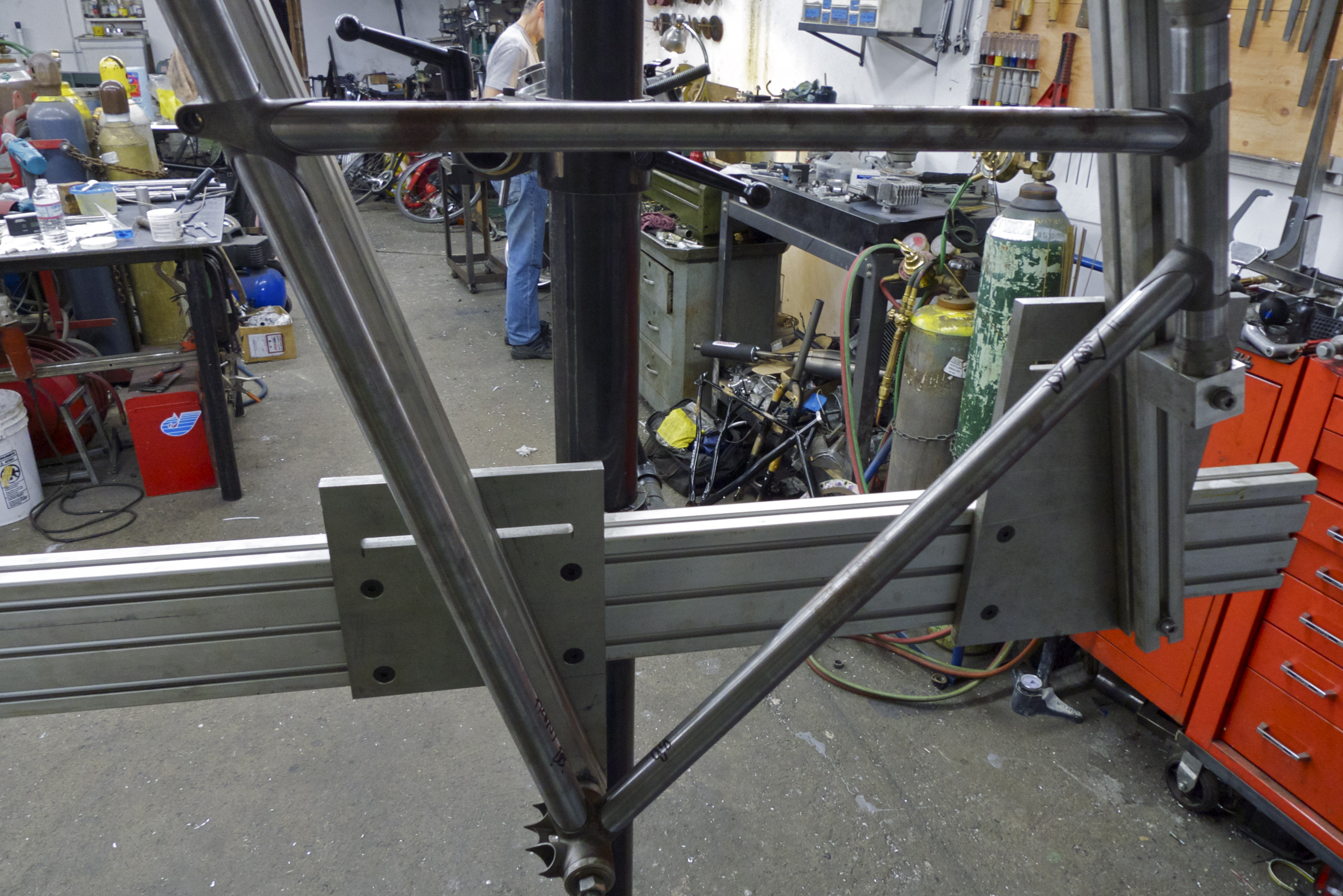
A bicycle frame building jig

A jig is a type of custom-made tool used to control the location or motion of parts or other tools.

== Description ==
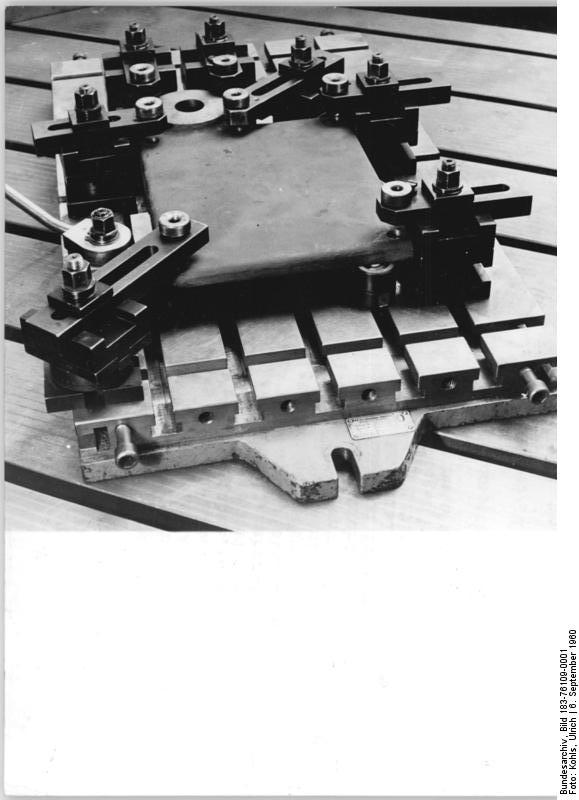
Device with grooves and chucks

A jig's primary purpose is to provide repeatability, accuracy, and interchangeability in the manufacturing of products.

For example, a jig is used in the process of duplicating a key; the original is used as a jig so the new key can have the same path as the one being copied. Since the advent of automation and computer numerical controlled (CNC) machines, jigs are often not required because the tool path is digitally programmed and stored in memory. Jigs may be made for reforming plastics.

Jigs or templates have been known long before the industrial age. There are many types of jigs, and each one is custom-tailored to do a specific job.

== Drill jig ==
A drill jig is a type of jig that expedites repetitive hole center location on multiple interchangeable parts by acting as a template to guide the twist drill or other boring device into the precise location of each intended hole center. In metalworking practice, typically a hardened drill bushing lines each hole on the jig plate to keep the tool from damaging the jig.

Drill jigs started falling into disuse with the invention of the jig borer. The need for them has further been reduced by CNC machine tools, where servo controls move the tool to the precise location it is needed.

== See also ==
- Jig grinder
- Staircase jig
- Sharpening jig
- Tapering jig
- Determinate Assembly
