= Fein Multimaster RS =

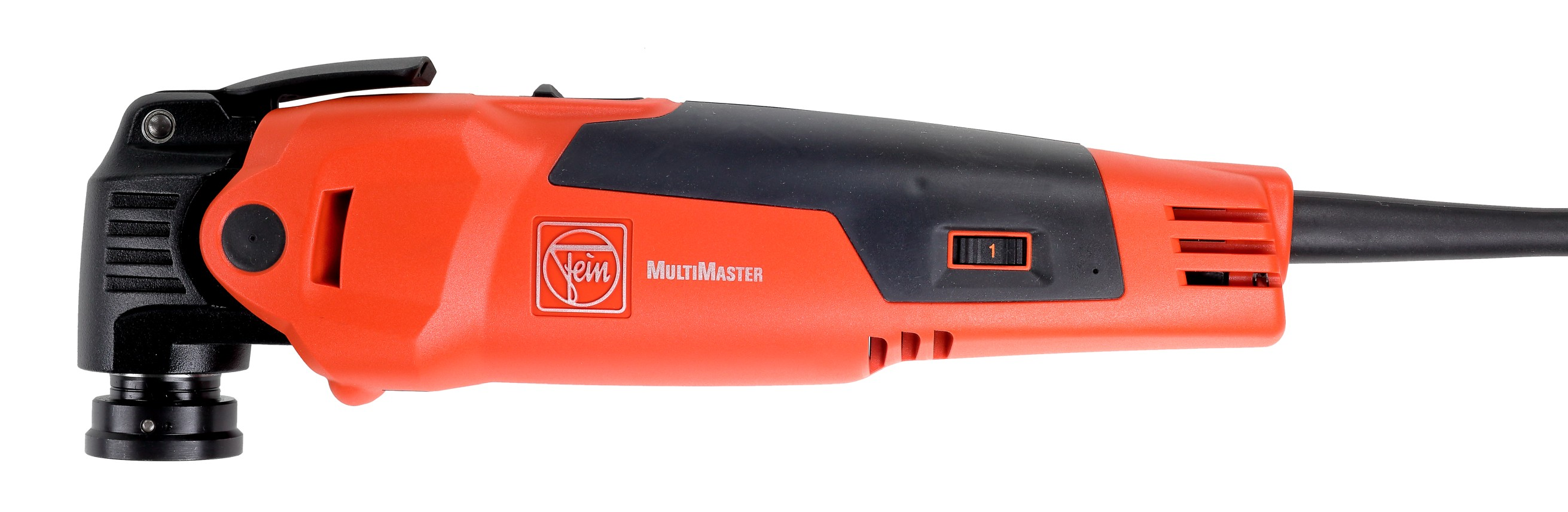
Fein Multimaster without blade

The Fein MultiMaster RS is a variable speed oscillating tool for cutting, sanding and grinding. It is produced by C. & E. Fein GmbH, along with a broad assortment of accessories.

When Fein's patent expired in October 2008, other tool makers started creating similar products, such as the Dremel Multi-Max, Bosch PS50 Multi-X, Rockwell Sonicraft, and Proxxon Delta Sander.

== Description ==
The MultiMaster oscillates at 200–350 Hz (11,000–20,000 oscillations per minute).

During the oscillating action, the fitted accessory moves along a minimal arc of 3.2 angular degrees. This allows for a greater degree of control by the operator as the lower torque means the tool has less power to move itself per oscillation, increasing safety while still completing the task at hand.
