= Burr (cutter) =

Small cutting tool

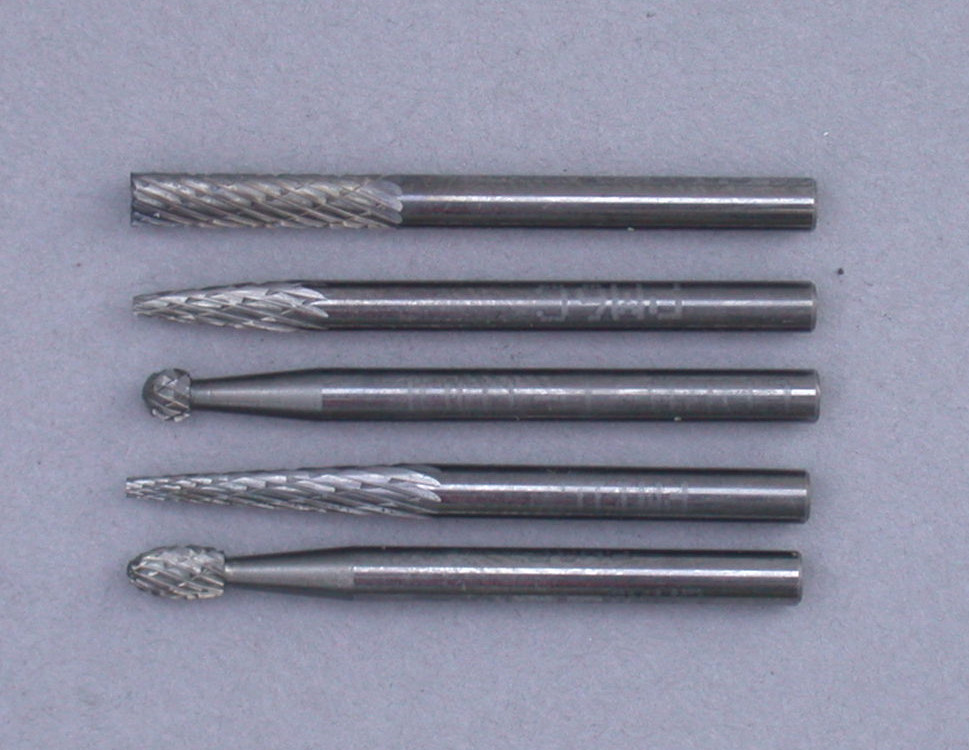
A selection of carbide burrs.

Burrs or burs (sometimes called rotary files) are small cutting tools; not to be confused with small pieces of metal formed from cutting metal, used in die grinders, rotary tools, or dental drills. The name may be considered appropriate when their small-sized head (3 mm diameter shaft) is compared to a bur (fruit seed with hooks) or their teeth are compared to a metal burr.

== Description ==
Burrs are a rotary analog to files that cut linearly (hence their alternate name, rotary files). They share many similarities with endmills and router bits, with the notable distinction that the latter typically have their toolpaths dictated by the machine, while burrs are frequently operated in a freehand manner. However, there is substantial overlap in the use and toolpath control of these various classes of cutters, and the outcomes accomplished with them. For example, endmills can be used in routers, and burrs can be used like endmills in milling by CNC or manual machine tools. These are often used in CNC machining centers for removing burrs (the small flakes of metal) after a machining process.

To achieve optimal surface speed and cutting conditions, burrs are rapidly rotated at high speeds, often in the range of thousands or tens of thousands of RPM, which is typically the maximum speed supported by a given spindle. The cutters depicted in the image, being made of tungsten carbide, can withstand and operate at these elevated speeds. This allows them to function at higher velocities compared to equivalent "HSS" (High-Speed Steel) cutters, all the while retaining the sharpness of their cutting edges.

Because the cutting edges of burrs are so small, they can often be touched when spinning by a finger without cutting the skin, which flexes out of the way, although it would not be safe to pinch or grip them from two sides. Hard metal or ceramic workpieces cannot flex beyond the cutting edges, so the tools remove material from them. This characteristic makes burrs suitable for use in dentistry, as the tool will grind the hard enamel of teeth, yet leaves soft mouth tissues unharmed if the tool should unintentionally touch them.
