= 1-2-3 blocks =

Machined steel blocks for machine setup

1-2-3 blocks

1-2-3 blocks are machined steel blocks used by machinists primarily on a mill for setup. They are sized 1" x 2" x 3".

The metric equivalent is 25-50-75mm blocks.

They are also available as 2" x 4" x 6" blocks

== Usage ==
1-2-3 blocks are primarily used for setup but, as they are accurately machined, also measuring. They may also be used as parallels. They are usually through drilled with multiple holes and every second hole threaded so that they may be clamped together. Primarily intended for metal machining they are also commonly used in woodwork. Like parallels they are usually used on the machine itself, unlike the more accurate gauge blocks which are normally used away from the machine.

== Manufacture ==
The process of machining blocks is very similar to parallels to which they are closely related. Made from hardened steel they are machined and ground all over to close tolerances as well as (usually) being through drilled and threaded.

== See also ==
- Parallel (engineering)
- Gauge block
