= Cast saw =

Saw for removing orthopedic casts

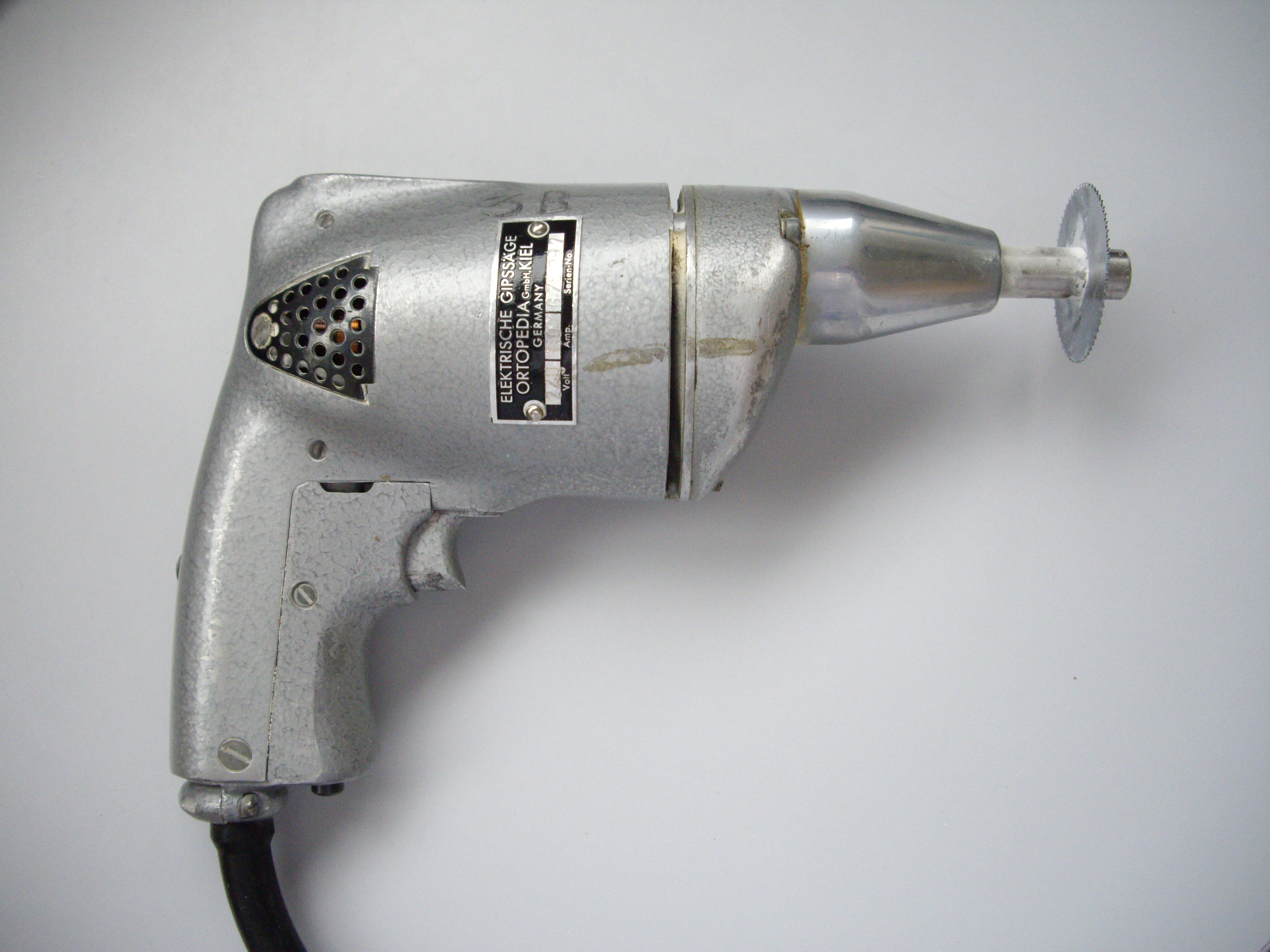
Elektrische Gipssäge, by Ortopedia, Kiel, Germany

A cast saw is an oscillating saw used to remove orthopedic casts. Instead of a rotating blade, cast saws use a sharp, small-toothed blade rapidly oscillating or vibrating back and forth over a minimal angle to cut material and are therefore not circular saws. This device is often used with a cast spreader.

The patient's skin frequently comes into contact with the cast saw blade without cutting although it can cause lacerations when used over bony prominences. The design enables the saw to cut rigid materials such as plaster or fiberglass. In contrast, soft tissues such as skin move back and forth with the blade, dissipating the shear forces, and preventing injury.

Modern cast saws date back to the plaster cast cutting saw which was submitted for a patent on April 2, 1945, by Homer H. Stryker, an orthopedic surgeon from Kalamazoo, Michigan.

Cast removal procedures result in complications in fewer than 1% of patients. These complications include skin abrasions or thermal injuries from friction between the saw and cast. Temperatures exceeding 101 °C (214 °F) have been recorded during the removal of fiberglass casts. The proper use of the saw is to perforate (instead of cutting) the cast, which can then be separated using a cast spreader.

Alternatives include cast cutting shears which were patented in 1950 by Neil McKay.

== See also ==
- Multi-tool (power tool)
