= Fein (company) =

German power tool manufacturer

C. & E. Fein GmbH
- Type: GmbH
- Founded: 1867
- Founder: Wilhelm Emil Fein
- Headquarters: Schwäbisch Gmünd formerly Stuttgart, Germany
- Products: Professional power tools
- Number of employees: 900
- Website: www.fein.de

C. & E. Fein GmbH is a manufacturer of high-end power tools located near Stuttgart, Germany. Founded in 1867 by brothers Wilhelm Emil Fein and Carl Fein, the company invented the hand-held electric drill in 1895 and was responsible for many other innovations. Fein became famous for its grinders, electric screwdrivers, and Fein Multimaster RS, the original oscillating multitool.

== History ==
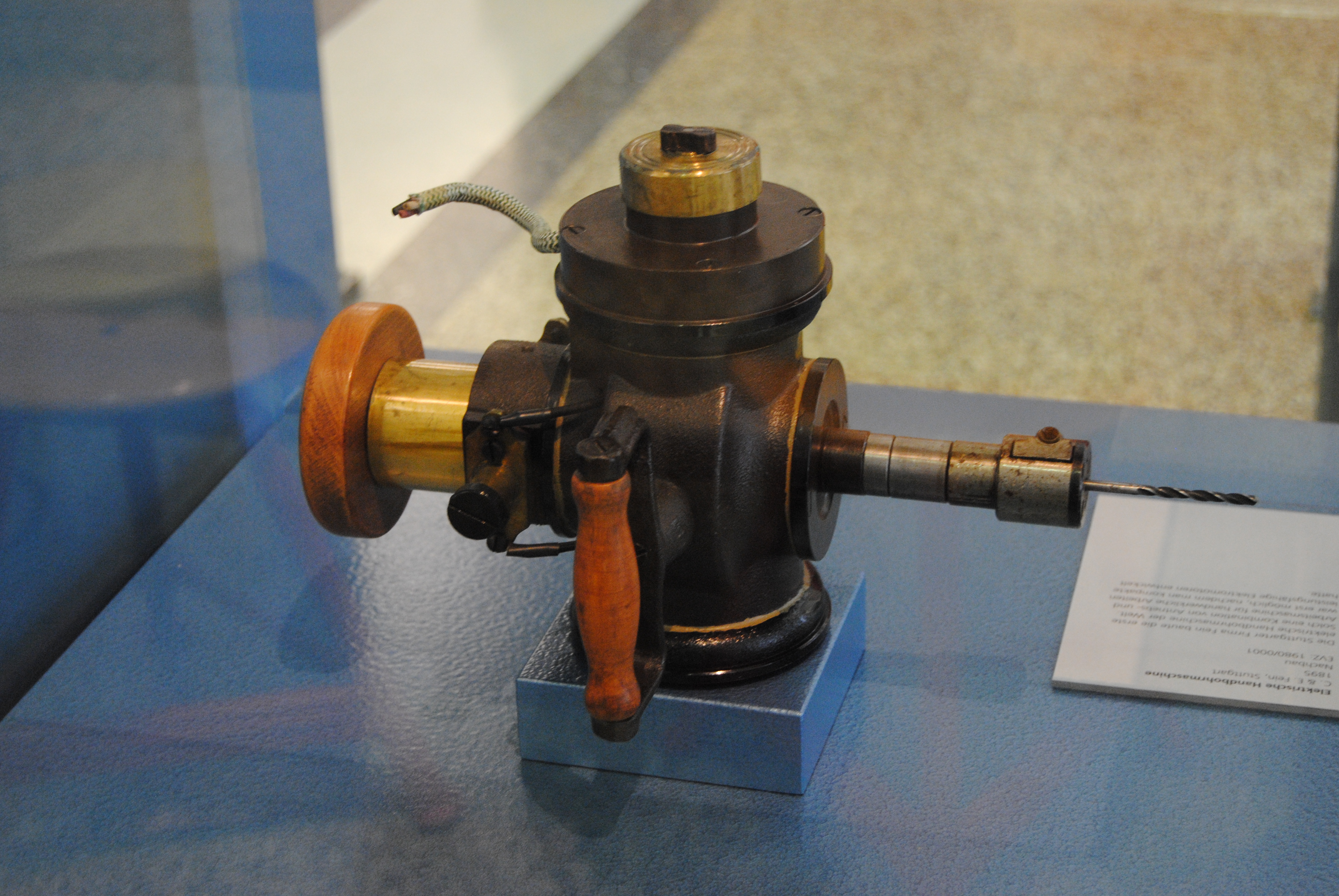
Fine hand drill from 1895 (replica) in the Technoseum Museum

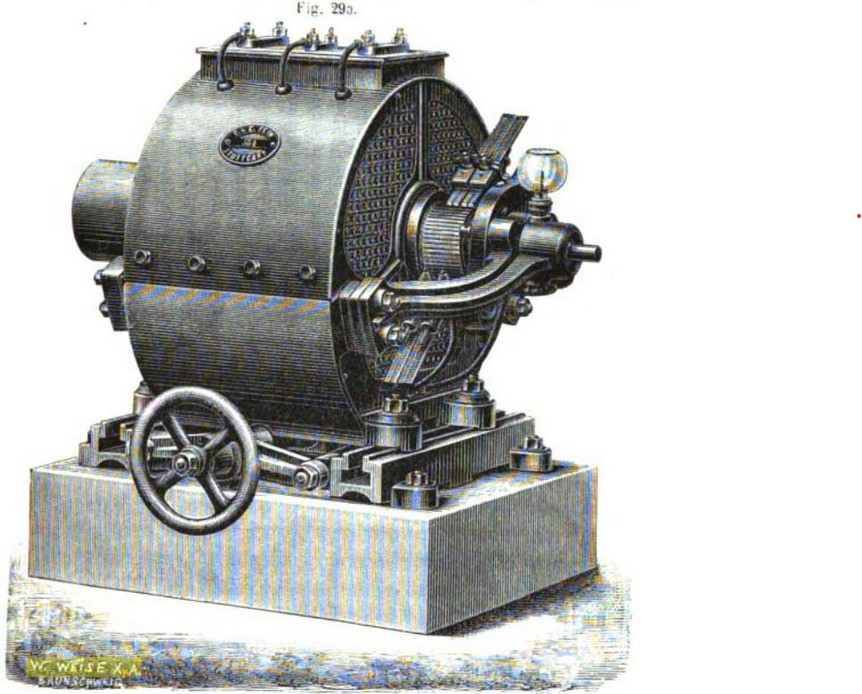
“Dynamo machine” produced by C. and E. Fein from 1888; illustration from 1890, signed W. Weise, XA, Braunschweig

In 1867, Wilhelm Emil Fein and his brother Carl founded a "mechanical workshop" in Stuttgart, the company C. & E. Fein. By 1873, the company had begun its first product line, focusing on medical induction apparatus and medical inductors. Two years later, Wilhelm Emil Fein invented the first electric fire alarm. In 1879, the city of Stuttgart installed a comprehensive fire alarm system developed by Fein, which included nine intercom stations (morse telegraphs), 50 alarm stations, and several telephones.

The company's growth continued, during its 25th anniversary celebration at the Liederhalle Culture and Congress Centre, C&E Fein celebrated the completion of its 1000th dynamo machine. Fein's fire alarm systems were widely adopted in cities including Nuremberg (1878), Gotha (1881), Ludwigsburg (1881), Frankfurt (Oder) (1882), Worms (1883), Regensburg (1887), Eßlingen am Neckar (1891), Bayreuth (1891), Karlsruhe (1892), Schwerin and Kempten (1894).

In 1895, Fein invented the electric hand drill, which is considered the forerunner of power tools.

The first "drill with electro-pneumatic hammer mechanism" was built in 1914 by the company and applied for a patent. Fein developed the first tin snips and the first jigsaw in 1927. In the 1950s, a handy small drill called "Fein-Zwerg" (Fein-Dwarf) helped boost popularity.

The first power tool with oscillation technology was launched in 1967, at the time as a plaster band cast saw. In 1985, the company's first cordless screwdriver appeared. In 1987, the Fein quick-clamping system QuickIN made the handling of angle grinders considerably safer. In 2007, the company presented a MultiMaster generation with QuickIN and better handling. In 2011, Fein presented the first handheld core drilling system for metal, KBH 25.

== Subsidiaries ==
The company has 16 sales subsidiaries through which distribution takes place.

== Products ==
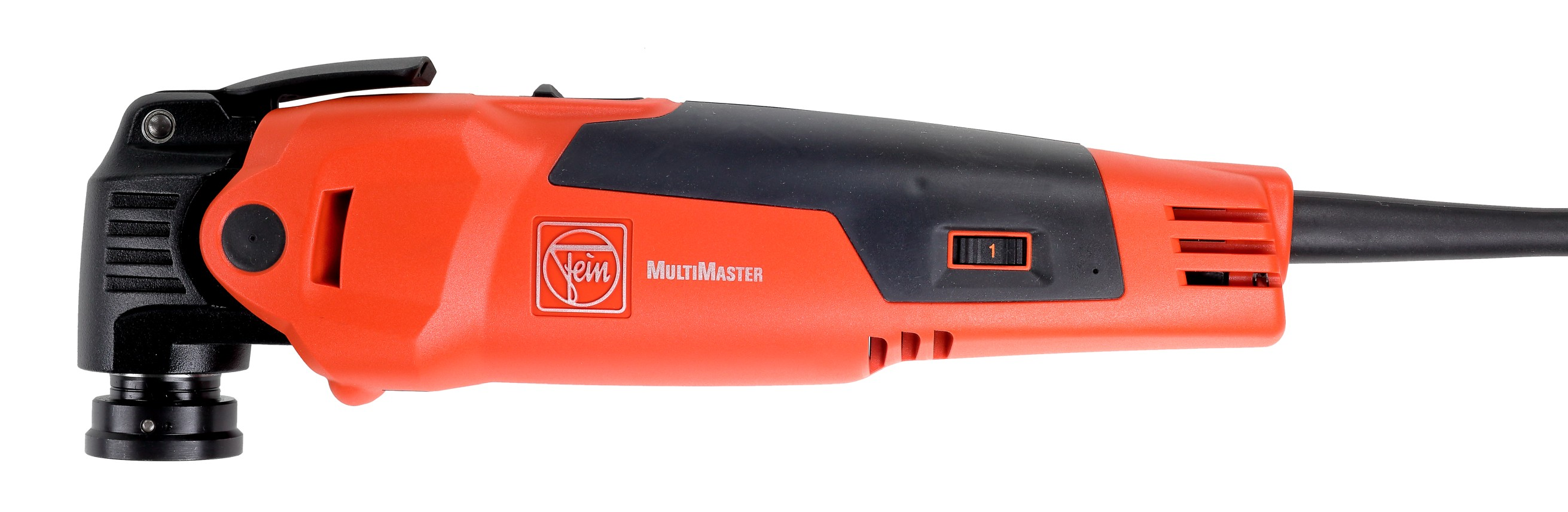
Fein Multimaster without a blade

C. & E. Fein GmbH is a vendor of diverse power tools and accessories. Their 2024 catalog includes drills, oscillating multi-tools, sanders, polishers, grinders, saws, and shop vacuums. Among their wide range of products are the ASCD 18-1000 W34 SELECT cordless impact wrench/driver, as well as a selection of FEIN cordless grinders. These tools are known for their performance and durability.
