= Moldmaker =

Skilled trade

A moldmaker (mouldmaker in English-speaking countries other than the US) or molder (moulder) is a skilled tradesperson who fabricates molds (or moulds) for use in casting metal products.

Moldmakers are generally employed in foundries, where molds are used to cast products from metals such as aluminium and cast iron.

== Injection molding ==
The term moldmaker may also refer to workers employed in fabricating dies and metal moulds for use in injection molding and die-casting, such as in the plastics, rubber or ceramics industries, in which case it is sometimes regarded as a branch of the trade of toolmaker. The process of manufacturing molds is often highly automated.

Although many of the machining processes involved in mold making use computer-controlled equipment for the manufacturing of molds (particularly plastic and rubber injection and transfer), moldmaking remains a highly skilled trade, requiring expertise in manual machining, CNC machining, CNC wire EDM, CNC Ram EDM, surface grinding, hand polishing and more. Because of the skill and intense labor involved, a lot of mold making in the US has been outsourced to low-wage countries. The majority of plastic and rubber parts are made using injection or transfer molds, requiring a mold to be manufactured by a moldmaker.

== See also ==
- Molding (process)
- Tool and die maker
