= Flat honing =

Metalworking grinding process

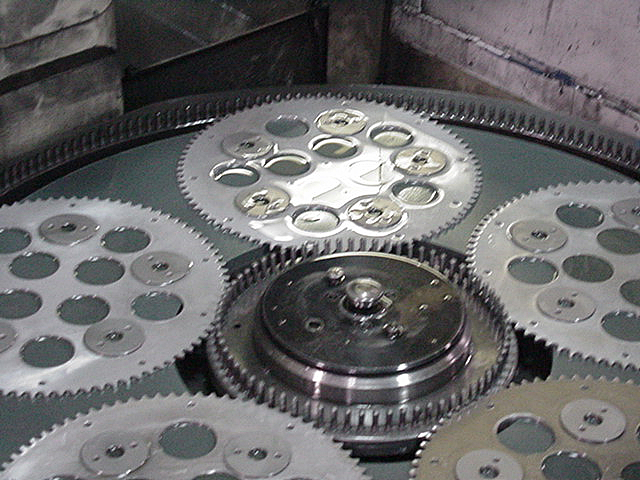
A flat honing machine

Flat honing is a metalworking grinding process used to provide high quality flat surfaces. It combines the speed of grinding or honing with the precision of lapping. It has also been known under the terms high speed lapping and high precision grinding.

== Origin of term ==
A schematic of a flat honing machine: 1. Carrier plate; 2. Workpiece; 3. Outer ring; 4. Driven inner ring; 5. Grinding wheel

The term is derived from honing cylinders and holes. A flat workpiece surface is processed, hence the word flat; the word honing is used because the cutting speed is low compared to grinding. A fixed abrasive is used to provide accuracy and optical appearance of the surface finish. Sometimes it is also called fine grinding or surface grinding using planetary kinematics.

== History ==
Planetary lapping was used in the WWII production of crystal oscillators.

In the 1980s, production lapping replaced by flat honing in an ever-expanding array of applications. The flat honing process allows for an equivalent quality result, but at a significant reduction in manufacturing costs per workpiece. Savings result from reduced process times and the ease of workpiece cleaning. However, more and more parts are processed directly from their blank operation (sintered, injected, punched, sawed, or similar) with highly precise tolerances and accuracy (flatness and roughness).

== Applications ==
Due to the tension-free reception of loose parts in the carriers, virtually any solid material can be processed. The application range is very wide, from a soft to a very hard material (thermoplastic plastic to sapphire or ceramic). The surface is similar to the typical honing crosshatch, this leads to good tribological properties and fine roughness. The low subsurface damage will have a positive impact on subsequent polishing processes (CMP, etching).

Examples are vane pump parts made of polyphenylene sulfide (PPS), ceramic insert made of SiNi, watch windows, sapphire LED wafers, bearing rings, vane pumps, gear steel, cutting knives and carbide.

== Method ==
The removal of the material is done by using geometrically undefined cutting edges (grain bound) that are held together in large working wheels with a thin layer of abrasive. The workpieces are held in toothed carriers (plastic, steel) that are driven by two horizontal pin rings. The full workpiece surface is in constant contact with an abrasive wheel. There are two different processes: Single and double sided machining.

The working wheel and the carriers are driven by different relative movements between the workpiece and the abrasive wheel. The rotation of the inner pin ring against the working wheel generates the stock removal. The operation itself will be flushed continually (mostly with oil) to ensure the clean working wheel does not become contaminated with grinding sludge.

== Materials ==
Most working wheels contain abrasive grains of synthetic diamond or cubic boron nitride (CBN). The grain shape, grain coating and the grain size are other important components for an optimal working process.

The bond has the task of holding the individual grains together until they become dull. Type and quantity of the binder used affects both the hardness and the abrasive properties of the working wheels. The outbreak of the abrasive grain is called self-sharpening.

The main task of the coolant is to aid in the dissipation of heat from removed stock. It also reduces the friction between the abrasive and the workpiece. Therefore, proper wetting, adhesion, pressure, temperature resistance, and corrosion protection are all factors when selecting a coolant. Oil (mineral or diester based) is used as the preferred cooling and flushing media. Water emulsions may also be used.

== Layout of flat honing wheels ==
Flat honing requires an exclusive wheel suitable for the type of material being processed. Flat honing wheels are available with full faced layers of abrasive although grooves of different geometry can be introduced to enhance a better removal of material. These abrasives are fixed onto a steel plate. For vitrified bonded flat honing wheels, round or hexagonal pellets are used and are fixed to the steel plate with a special adhesive. The spaces between the pellets or segments are used to reduce the contact between the workpiece and the abrasive wheel. They also cool and lubricate the process. All types of flat honing wheels can vary in grain concentration and grain size along the area of the wheel which results in an even wear over the complete wheel.
