= Charles DeVlieg =

Charles B. DeVlieg, called Charlie or CB (1892–1973) was a pioneering tool designer who founded the DeVlieg Machine Tool Company in Michigan.

He developed a series of increasingly precise horizontal boring machines which culminated in the JIGMIL. This was so accurate that it did not require expensive jigs and was adopted extensively throughout industry, selling 4,500 units. The first JIGMIL is now in the Henry Ford Museum and Charles DeVlieg has entered the Machine Tool Hall of Fame.

He founded the DeVlieg Foundation in 1961, a charity which promoted engineering education.
