= Load rejection =

Load rejection in an electric power system is the condition in which there is a sudden load loss in the system which causes the generating equipment to be over-frequency.

A load rejection test is part of commissioning for power systems to confirm that the system can withstand a sudden loss of load and return to normal operating conditions using its governor. Load banks are normally used for these tests.

== See also ==
- Power outage
