= Cold cream =

Facial treatment cream

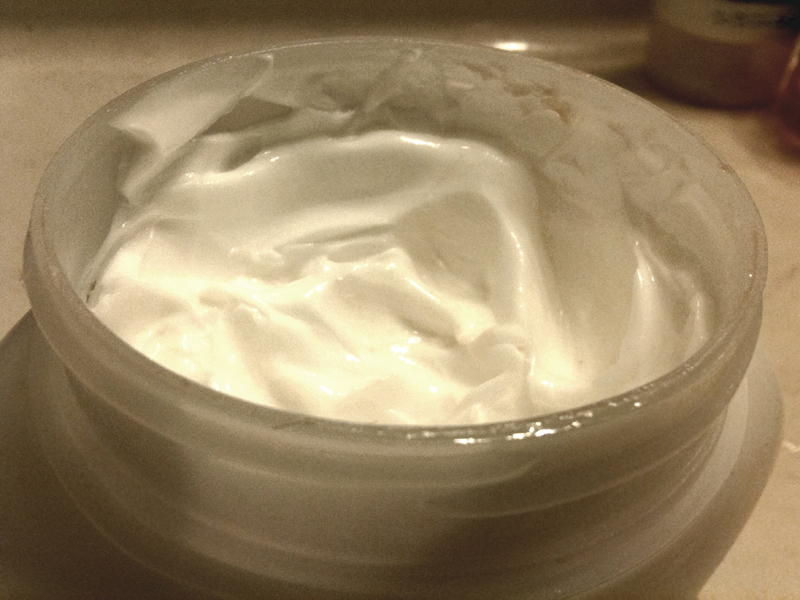
Cold cream

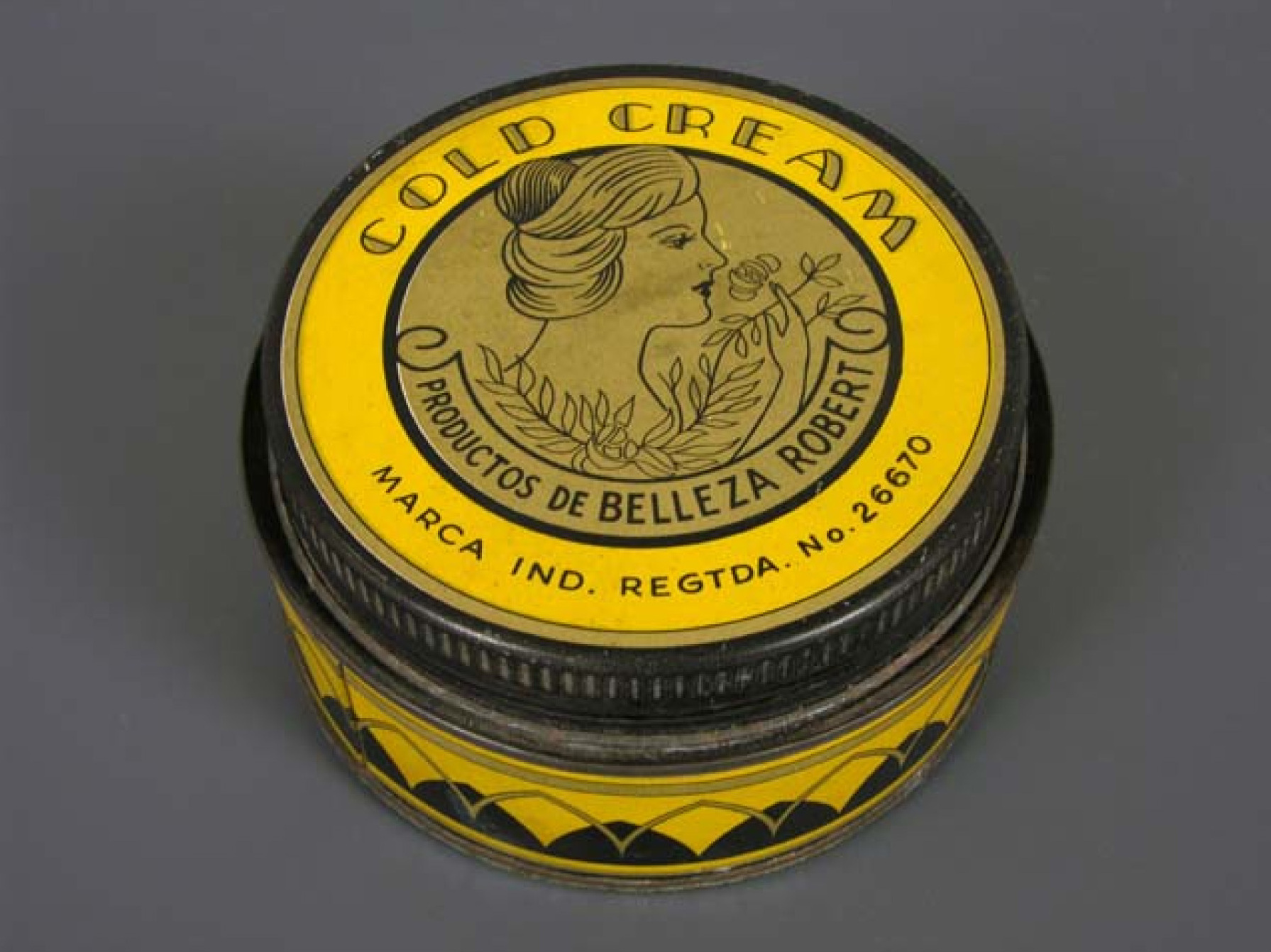
Jar for cold cream from the first half of the 20th century from the Museo del Objeto del Objeto collection.

Cold cream, also known as ceratum refrigerans, is an emulsion of water and certain fats, usually including beeswax and various scent agents, designed to smooth skin and remove makeup. Cold cream is a water-in-oil emulsion (emulsion of small amount of water in a larger amount of oil), unlike the oil-in-water emulsion of vanishing cream, so-called because it seems to disappear when applied on skin. The name "cold cream" derives from the cooling feeling that the cream leaves on the skin. Variations of the product have been used for nearly 2000 years.

Cold cream is mainly used for skin treatment (such as a facial mask or lip balm), due to its moisturizing properties. It can also be used as shaving cream and as a makeup remover.

== History ==
The invention of cold cream is credited to Galen, a physician in second century Greece. The original formulation involved rose water, beeswax, and either almond or olive oil. The beeswax is essential to a successful cream, as it is the emulsifying ingredient, but it is extremely inefficient compared to modern emulsifiers. Creams made with only beeswax require extensive mixing and can separate upon standing. Thus, small quantities of borax were later added in addition to the beeswax. Borax saponifies fatty acids in the beeswax and allows for a more stable cream, using the small quantities of soap created as the emulsifying agent.

This 1857 account relates:

The modern formula for cold cream is, however, quite a different thing to that given in the works of Galen, in point of odour and quality, although substantially the same--grease and water. In perfumery there are several kinds of cold cream, distinguished by their odour, such as that of camphor, almond, violet, roses, etc.

In France, this substance is still known as cérat de Galien ('Galen's Wax'). A copy of the London Dispensatory, edited by Nicholas Culpeper and published in the year 1650 included the following formula for this substance:

Take of white wax four ounces, oyl of roses omphacine a pound; melt in a double vessel, then powr it out into another, by degrees putting in cold water, and often powring it out of one vessel into another, stirring it till it be white; last of all wash it in rose water, adding a little rose water and rose vineger.

— Nicholas Culpeper (1650), London Dispensatory

An 1814 poem credited to "Dr. Russell" gives the following account of the benefits attributed to cold cream in that day:

WHEN a pot of cold cream to Eliza you send,
You with words to this purpose your present commend;
Whoe'er with this cream shall her countenance smear,
All redness and roughness will strait disappear,
And the skin to a wonder be charmingly clear;
If pimples arise, this will take them away;
If the small-pox should mark you, those marks will decay;
If wrinkled through age, or bad dawbing the face is,
'Twill be smooth in a trice, as the best Venice glass is;
All this, and much more (could I spare time to write it,
Or my pen go as fast, as your lips would indite it)
You affirm of your cream: and I would not abuse it,
But pray tell me one thing—Do you yourself use it?

— Dr. Russell, To a Lady: in imitation of the thirtieth Epigram of the fifth Book of Martial

When mixed with water, plant oils spoil rapidly, so cold cream was most often made in small batches at home or in local pharmacies.

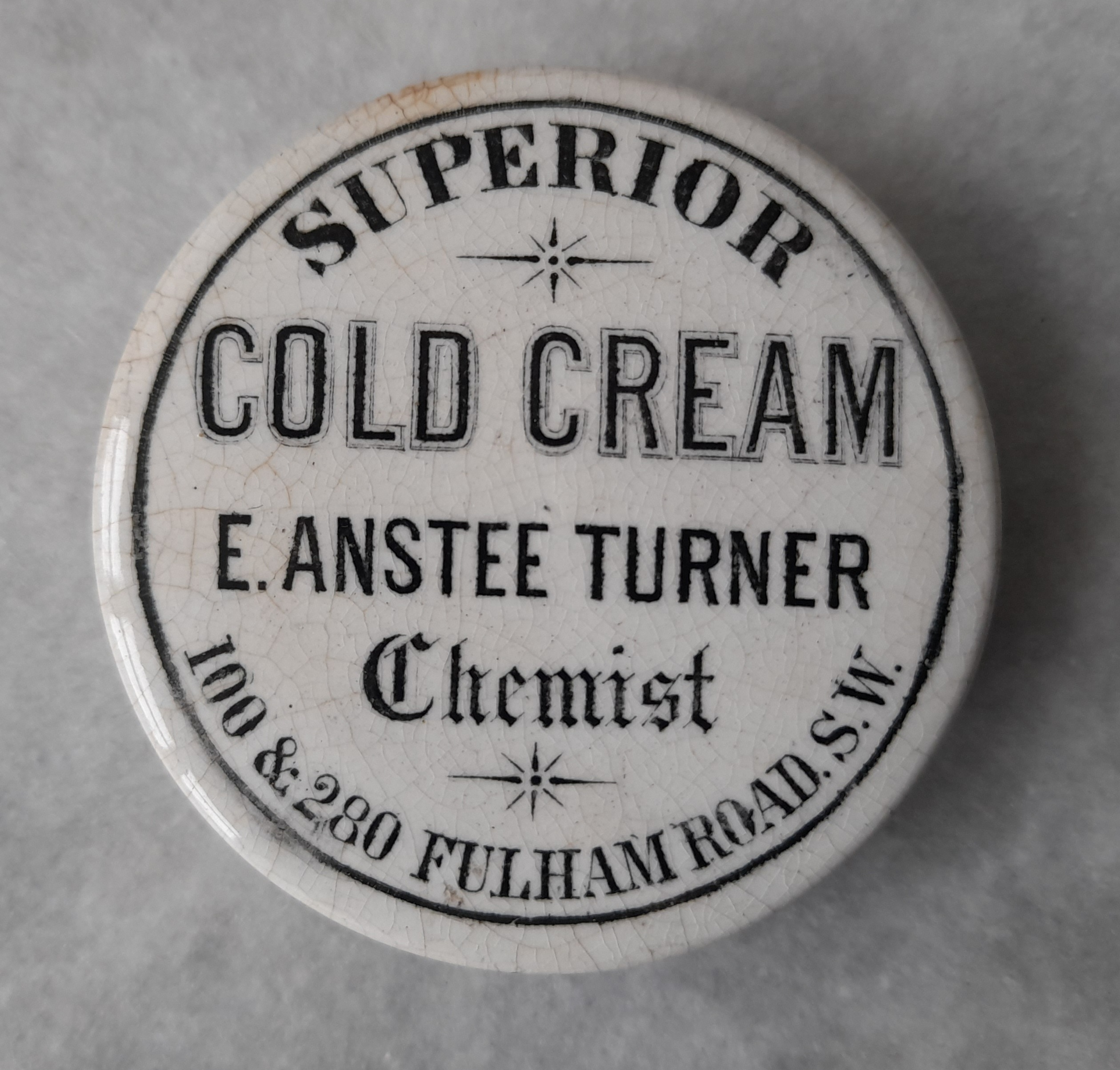
E. Anstee Turner chemist C19th printed pottery Cold Cream pot lid, Fulham Rd, London

== Modern formulation ==
Almost all modern cold creams have replaced the plant oils with mineral oil and have added alcohol, glycerin, and lanolin. Beginning in the 1970s, jojoba oil became a common ingredient, used as a substitute of spermaceti from whales. Widely sold brands of cold cream in the United States include Pond's and Noxzema.

Over the centuries, new uses have been found for the product: "As a toilet requisite cold cream is used for softening and cooling the skin after sunburn, as a cleansing cream, to relieve harshness of the skin, etc."

== See also ==
- Cream (pharmaceutical)
