= Boring bar =

Tool used in metalworking and woodworking

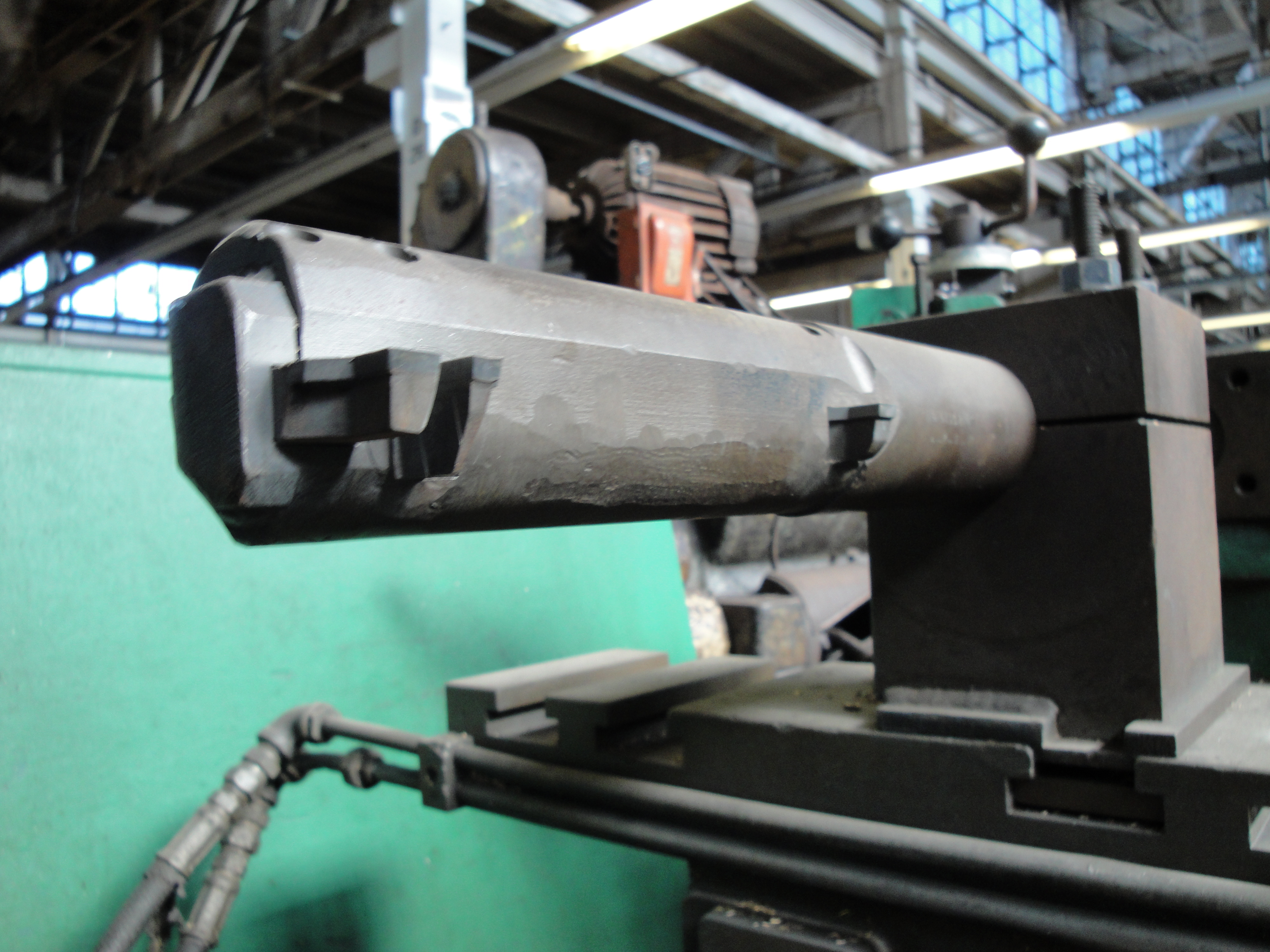
A part's-eye view of a boring bar. It enters into an existing hole (drilled or cored), and the single-point cutters cut a cylindrical toolpath that is extremely accurate, being defined by the spindle's rotation and the linear motion of the Z-axis slide. In this case, the tool bits are of the brazed carbide type.

Boring bar marked B

A boring bar is a tool used in metalworking and woodworking. Boring is a technique used in many aspects of building. Woodworkers have used boring as a form of drilling for centuries. In woodworking, the boring tool is static in size and used to form circular plunge cuts. In metalworking, boring is slightly different in that the hole that results need not be circular. In metal boring the tool can be plunged and dragged on the X or Y axes to create a slot or asymmetrical hole or channel, or it may be moved only in an up-and-down motion (on the Z axis) to create a perfect circular hole.

== Components ==
Modern boring tools have three primary components although many differing designs. The parts include the body, bar holder and dial screw (graduated micro screw). The body, made of solid stock, has two basic parts. The top part threads or presses into the supporting shank. The lower part (bar holder) is connected via dovetail, T-slots or a smooth notch with an adjustment for bore diameter via the dial screw. As the dial screw is adjusted, the cutting bit/s are moved further out, creating a larger cut. This also can create some slight distortion if the cutting tool is moved further than the boring head is designed to support, if there is undue wear in the bearings supporting the tool or if the tool speed is too great for the off-balance effect caused by moving the tool too far from center. This is called unbalanced gyroscope precession. Once the dial screw has been adjusted to give the proper cut a set screw is generally used to prevent any additional movement of the cutting head. The third basic part is the boring tool. Boring tools can be mounted vertically or horizontally in many boring head designs.

== Boring machines ==
Boring can be done on mills, lathes or drill press machines, either with a boring head or with just a boring tool. The shorter the distance between the tool holder and the material, the less distortion created from vibration or unbalanced gyroscopic effects. The greater the distance (static or dynamic mounts) the more flex in the tool or an increase in the imbalance of a moving tool. Use of a boring head increases the mass of the tool holder and decreases the distance. If a vibration is created it will be at a higher frequency and the deflection of the tool from the desired path will be much smaller and easier to erase through repetitive tool passes. In the case of a dynamic tool (mill or press), the balance of the tool can be adjusted with counterweights if the tool is mounted perpendicular to the shaft or the tool length can be decreased.
