= Honing (metalworking) =

Production of a precise surface on a metal workpiece

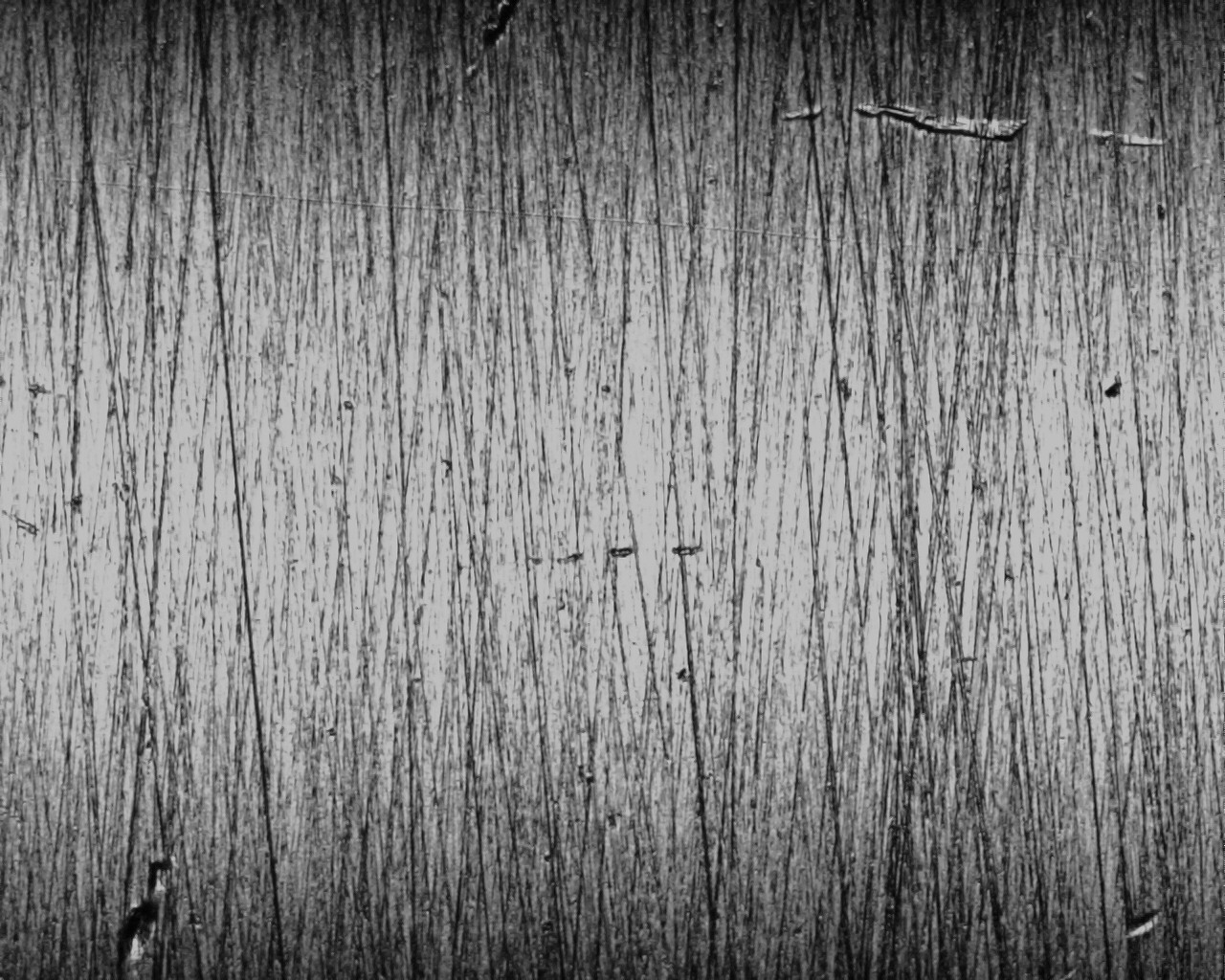
The surface of a honed workpiece

Honing is an abrasive machining process that produces a precision surface on a metal workpiece by scrubbing an abrasive grinding stone or grinding wheel against it along a controlled path. Honing is primarily used to improve the geometric form of a surface, but can also improve the surface finish.

Typical applications are the finishing of cylinders for internal combustion engines, air bearing spindles and gears. There are many types of hones, but all consist of one or more abrasive stones that are held under pressure against the surface they are working on.

Other similar processes are lapping and superfinishing.

== Honing machines ==
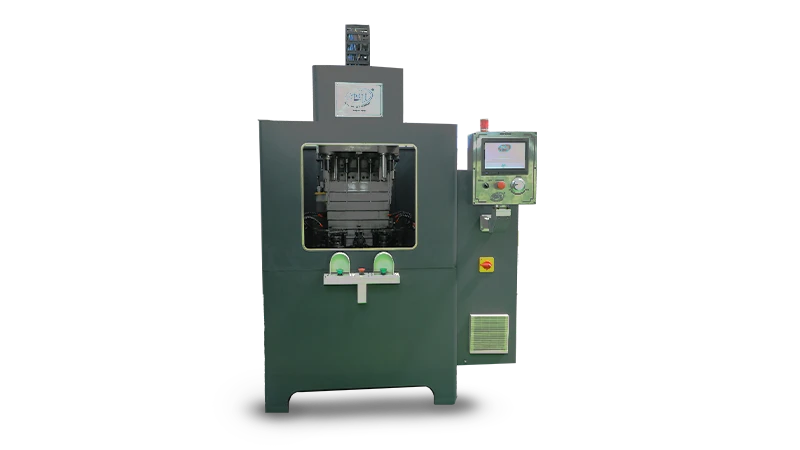
Auto-gauging single-pass honing machine for precise finishing.

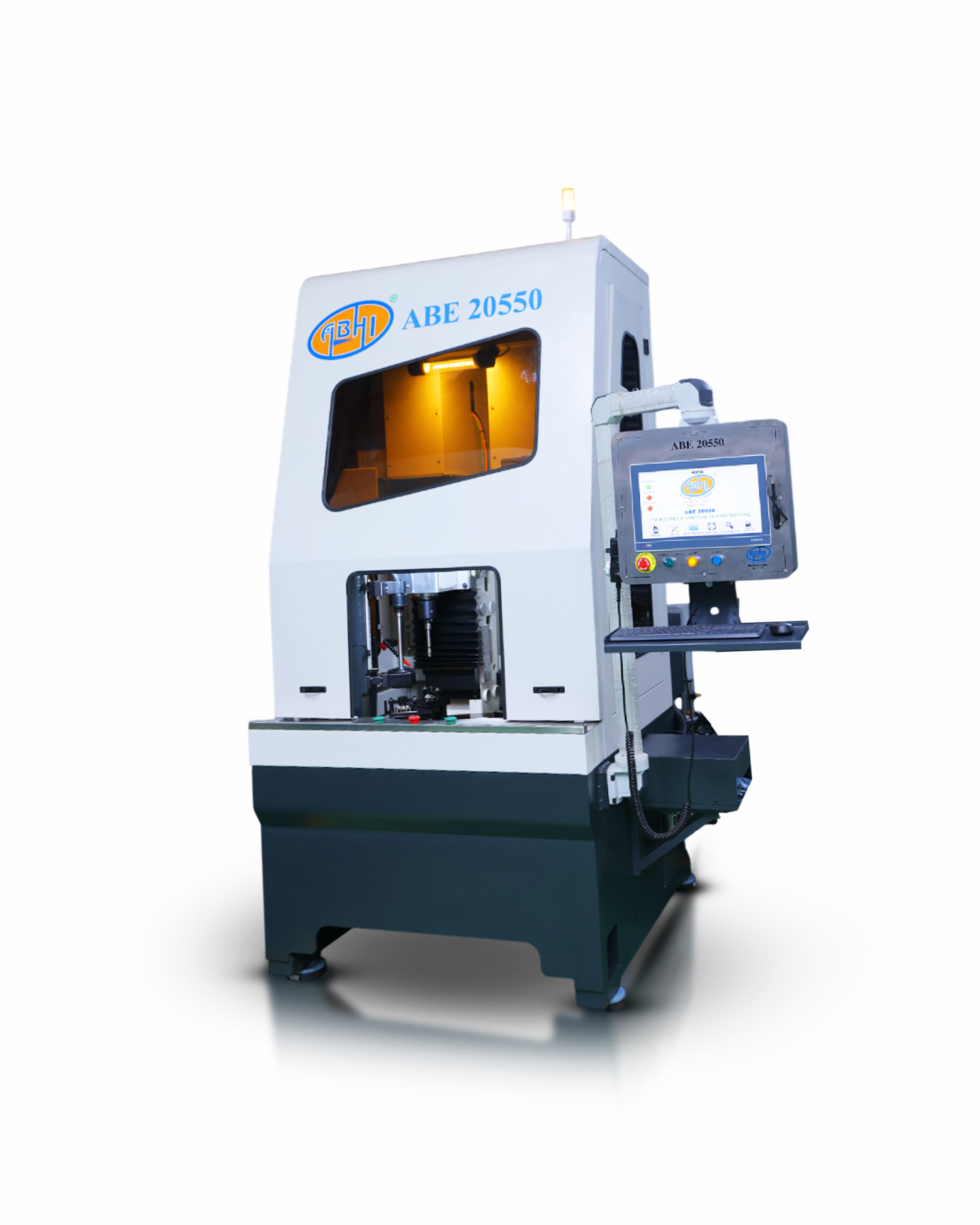
Twin-spindle expansion honing machine with advanced auto-gauging and auto-compensative features for precision bore finishing.

A honing machine is a precision tool used in machining to improve the surface finish and dimensional accuracy of a component. It operates by using abrasive honing tools, which rotate and reciprocate inside the components, typically a cylinder or bore. This process enhances the internal surface quality, achieving precise dimensions and smooth finishes.

Honing machines come in various types, including cylinder, hydraulic cylinder, vertical, expansion and horizontal models. Cylinder honing machines are designed for interior surfaces of cylindrical components, while vertical, expansion and horizontal models are suited for different orientations and sizes of workpieces.

These machines are essential in manufacturing for achieving high precision and consistency in parts such as engine cylinders, landing gear, and hydraulic components. Advanced models, such as auto-gauging and expansion single-pass honing machines, multi-pass honing machines, feature automation and real-time measurement systems to further enhance efficiency and accuracy.

== Honing fixtures ==
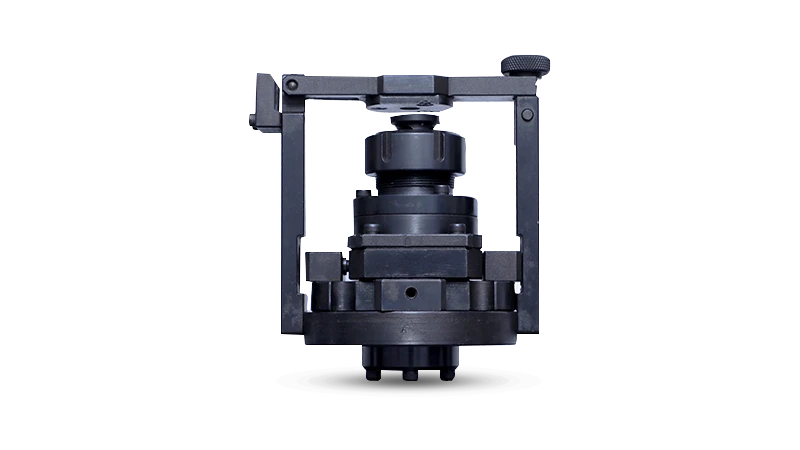
Axial floating fixture for precise alignment during honing.

Honing fixtures are specialized tools used in the honing process of machining, designed to ensure precise alignment and stability of components during the honing operation. These fixtures are essential for achieving high accuracy and surface finish in cylindrical and other intricate components. Typically employed in manufacturing and maintenance applications, honing fixtures facilitate the effective removal of material to achieve desired tolerances and surface quality.

== Honing stones ==
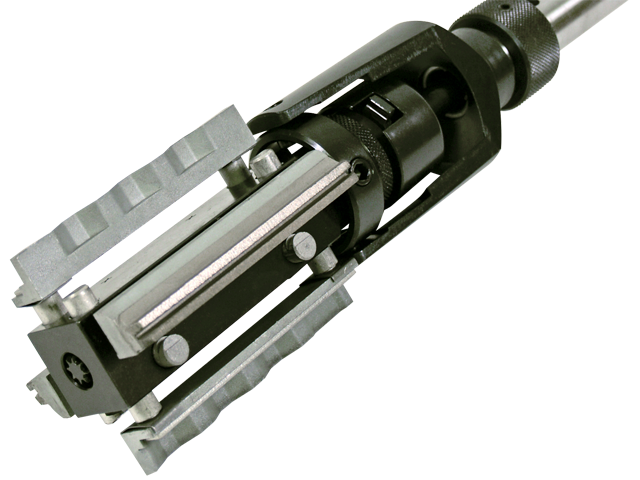
Superabrasives and hone head for cylinders

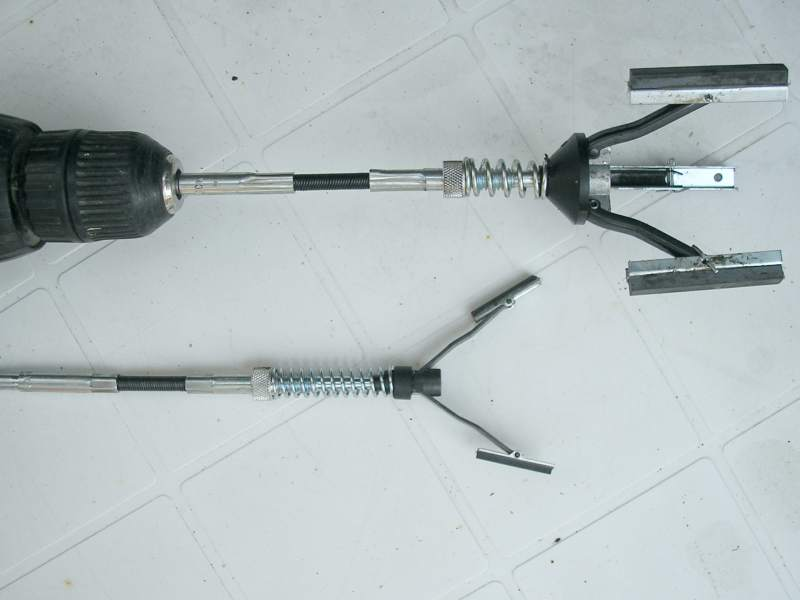
Honing tools

Honing uses a special tool, called a honing stone or a hone, to achieve a precision surface. The hone is composed of abrasive grains that are bound together with an adhesive. Generally, honing grains are irregularly shaped and about 10 to 50 micrometers in diameter (300 to 1500 mesh grit). Smaller grain sizes produce a smoother surface on the workpiece.

A honing stone is similar to a grinding wheel in many ways, but honing stones are usually more friable, so that they conform to the shape of the workpiece as they wear in. To counteract their friability, honing stones may be treated with wax or sulfur to improve life; wax is usually preferred for environmental reasons.

Any abrasive material may be used to create a honing stone, but the most commonly used are corundum, silicon carbide, cubic boron nitride, and diamond. The choice of abrasive material is usually driven by the characteristics of the workpiece material. In most cases, corundum or silicon carbide are acceptable, but extremely hard workpiece materials must be honed using superabrasives.

The hone is usually turned in the bore while being moved in and out. Special cutting fluids are used to give a smooth cutting action and to remove the material that has been abraded. Machines can be portable, simple manual machines, or fully automatic with gauging depending on the application.

Modern advances in abrasives have made it possible to remove much larger amounts of material than was previously possible. This has displaced grinding in many applications where "through machining" is possible. External hones perform the same function on shafts.

== Process mechanics ==
Since honing stones look similar to grinding wheels, it is tempting to think of honing as a form of low-stock removal grinding. Instead, it is better to think of it as a self-truing grinding process.

In grinding, the wheel follows a simple path. For example, in plunge grinding a shaft, the wheel moves in towards the axis of the part, grinds it, and then moves back out. Since each slice of the wheel repeatedly contacts the same slice of the workpiece, any inaccuracies in the geometric shape of the grinding wheel will be transferred onto the part. Therefore, the accuracy of the finished workpiece geometry is limited to the accuracy of the truing dresser. The accuracy becomes even worse as the grind wheel wears, so truing must occur periodically to reshape it.

The limitation on geometric accuracy is overcome in honing because the honing stone follows a complex path. In bore honing, for example, the stone moves along two paths simultaneously. The stones are pressed radially outward to enlarge the hole while they simultaneously oscillate axially. Due to the oscillation, each slice of the honing stones touches a large area of the workpiece. Therefore, imperfections in the honing stone's profile cannot transfer to the bore. Instead, both the bore and the honing stones conform to the average shape of the honing stones' motion, which in the case of bore honing is a cylinder. This averaging effect occurs in all honing processes; both the workpiece and stones erode until they conform to the average shape of the stones' cutting surface. Since the honing stones tend to erode towards a desired geometric shape, there is no need to true them. As a result of the averaging effect, the accuracy of a honed component often exceeds the accuracy of the machine tool that created it.

The path of the stone is not the only difference between grinding and honing machines, they also differ in the stiffness of their construction. Honing machines are much more compliant than grinders. The purpose of grinding is to achieve a tight size tolerance. To do this, the grinding wheel must be moved to an exact position relative to the workpiece. Therefore, a grinding machine must be very stiff and its axes must move with very high precision.

A honing machine is relatively inaccurate and imperfect. Instead of relying on the accuracy of the machine tool, it relies on the averaging effect between the stone and the workpiece. Compliance is a requirement of a honing machine that is necessary for the averaging effect to occur. This leads to an obvious difference between the two machines: in a grinder the stone is rigidly attached to a slide, while in honing the stone is actuated with pneumatic or hydraulic pressure.

High-precision workpieces are usually ground and then honed. Grinding determines the size, and honing improves the shape.

The difference between honing and grinding is not always the same. Some grinders have complex movements and are self-truing, and some honing machines are equipped with in-process gauging for size control. Many through-feed grinding operations rely on the same averaging effect as honing.

== Honing configurations ==
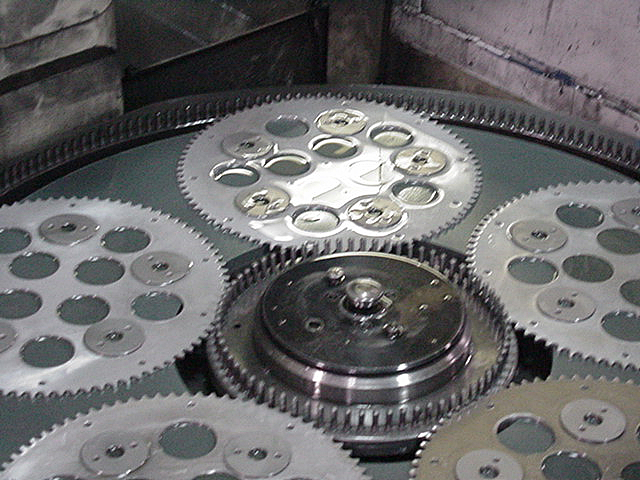
A flat honing machine

- Bore honing
- Flat honing
- OD honing / Super Finish / Fine Finish (taper and straight)
- Spherical honing
- Track/raceway honing

== Economics ==
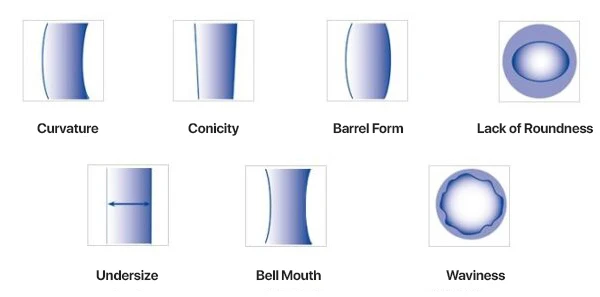
Common bore geometry errors in machining.

Since honing is a high-precision process, it is also relatively expensive. Therefore, it is only used in components that demand the highest level of precision. It is typically the last manufacturing operation before the part is shipped to a customer. The dimensional size of the object is established by preceding operations, the last of which is usually grinding. Then the part is honed to improve a form characteristic such as surface finish, roundness, flatness, cylindricity, or sphericity.

== Performance advantages of honed surfaces ==
Since honing is a relatively expensive manufacturing process, it can only be economically justified for applications that require very good form accuracy. The improved shape after honing may result in a quieter running or higher-precision component.

== Engine Honing ==
Engine cylinders are honed to produce a cross-hatch pattern that retains lubricating oil and promotes proper piston ring seating and sealing. If the cylinder is polished too smooth by the rings, it is considered glazed. A glazed cylinder wall can reduce oil retention and interfere with ring seating, leading to blow-by and increased wear. Although brake rotors and flywheels are also given controlled surface finishes, those finishes are intended to optimize friction and component bedding rather than to retain lubricant.

In a gasoline or diesel engine, the pistons ride up and down within the engine, maintaining a tight seal with the cylinder walls via the piston rings. Over time, the constant rubbing of the rings against the cylinder wall can wear the wall to a smooth, or glazed, finish. This makes it more difficult for lubricating oil in the engine to adhere properly, which in turn increases friction. Additionally, while breaking in newly installed piston rings, a small amount of wear must occur between rings and cylinder wall in order to seat the rings properly, and ensure a gas-tight seal. If the cylinder walls are too smooth, this wear will not occur, with the rings "skating" over the polished surface.

When honing an engine, the target crosshatching angle is approximately 45 degrees. Crosshatching that deviates too far from this number can cause problematic behavior in the engine. If the crosshatch is too flat, the oil may adhere to the cylinder walls too well. This can cause oil to stick in the bores and not be scraped back down into the crankcase by the piston rings. Whereas if the crosshatch is too vertical, oil adhesion will be poor and won't properly lubricate the cylinders.

After a typical cylinder hone, not only will the cylinder have the cross-hatch valleys as intended, but the honing process also introduces microscopic peaks into the bore. These peaks are not an ideal seating surface for the piston rings, causing increased blow-by. While the piston rings will eventually smooth out these peaks, leaving only the valleys, this is an undesirable process that can take hundreds to thousands of miles. One of the solutions to this issue is a plateau finish, which is the process of doing this smoothing job before ever putting the piston back in the cylinder bore. There are a few ways this can be done; finishing with a finer grit hone, a nylon bristle plateau honing tool, or even cork.

== See also ==
- Single-pass bore finishing
