= Spindle oil =

Spindle oils are a type of low-viscosity mineral oil marketed for use in lubrication of high-speed machine spindles. Spindle oil is free from gumming properties. Since the viscosity is so low that the oil runs off the surface of the spindle during shut-down periods, the spindle oil may be doped with additives that prevent rusting. Since the spindle oil often is used in textile factories, it is also important that it doesn't stain the textiles.

== See also ==
- Lubricating oil
- Mineral oil
