= Dummy load =

Device used to simulate an electrical load

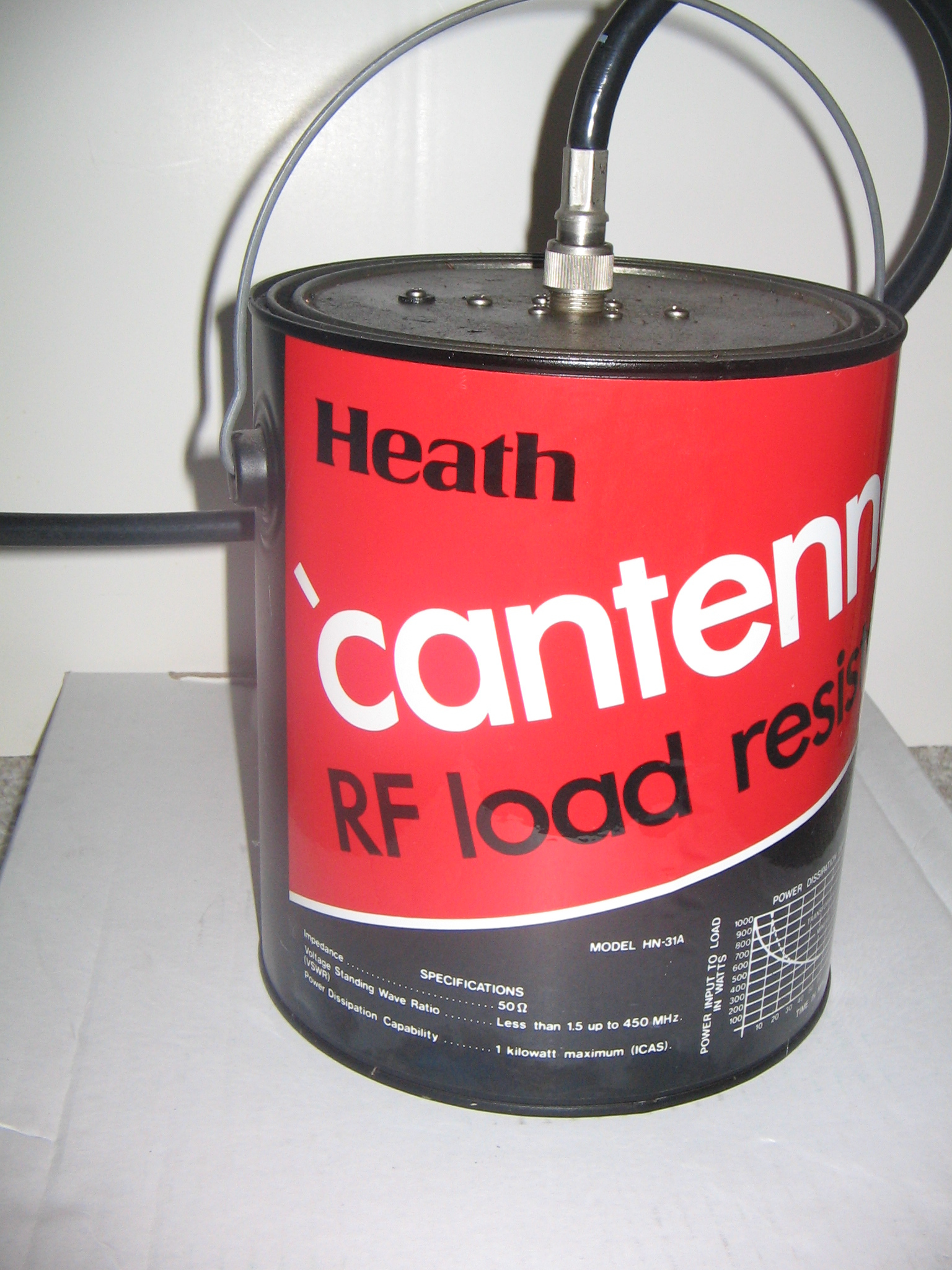
Small RF dummy load with capacity of 1 kW at frequencies up to 450 MHz. It consists of a 50Ω resistor immersed in oil to absorb the heat.

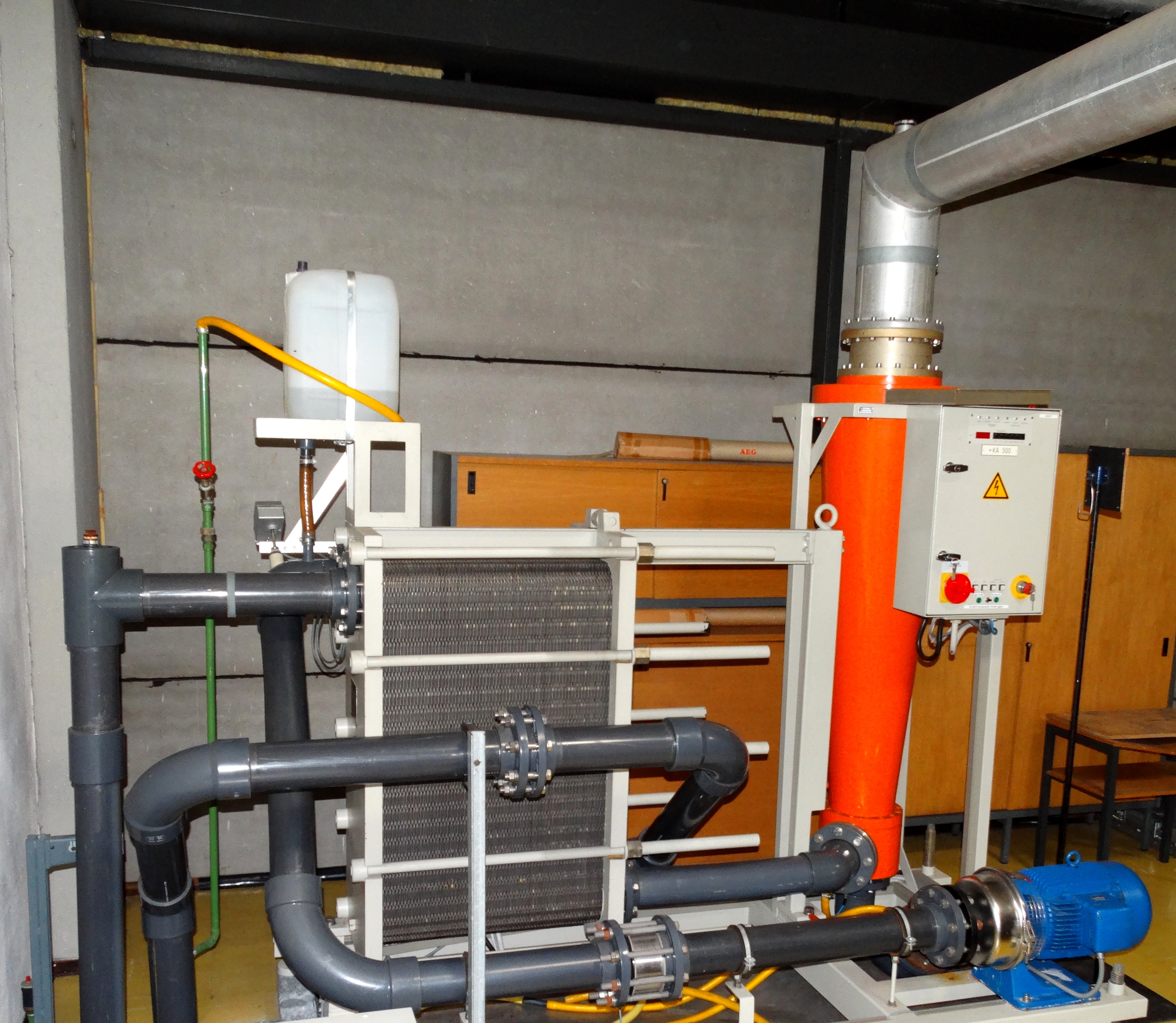
Large RF dummy load for shortwave transmitter at the Moosbrunn transmitting station of the Austrian Broadcasting Service, Moosbrunn, Austria. It uses a sodium hydroxide solution to absorb the radio energy, which is circulated through the radiator (center) to cool it. It has a capacity of 100 kW.

A dummy load is a device used to simulate an electrical load, usually for testing purposes. In radio a dummy antenna is connected to the output of a radio transmitter and electrically simulates an antenna, to allow the transmitter to be adjusted and tested without radiating radio waves. A dummy load is connected to the output of an audio power amplifier to electrically simulate a loudspeaker, allowing the amplifier to be tested without producing sound. Load banks are connected to electrical power supplies to simulate the supply's intended electrical load for testing purposes.

== Radio ==
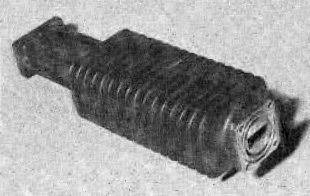
Microwave dummy load designed to attach to waveguide.

In radio this device is also known as a dummy antenna or a radio frequency termination. It is a device, usually a resistor, used in place of an antenna to aid in testing a radio transmitter. It is substituted for the antenna while one adjusts the transmitter, so that no radio waves are radiated so that the transmitter does not interfere with other radio transmitters during the adjustments. (As no dummy load is ideal, however, some radiation does occur). If a transmitter is tested without a load attached to its output terminals such as an antenna or a dummy load, the power will be reflected back into the transmitter, often overheating and damaging it. Also, if a transmitter is adjusted without a load, it will operate differently as compared with a load, and the adjustments may be incorrect.

The dummy load ordinarily should be a pure resistance; the amount of resistance should be the same as the impedance of the antenna or transmission line that is used with the transmitter (usually 50 Ω or 75 Ω). The radio energy that is absorbed by the dummy load is converted to heat. A dummy load must be chosen or designed to tolerate the amount of power that can be delivered by the transmitter. Typically it consists of a resistor attached to some type of heat sink to dissipate the power from the transmitter.

The ideal dummy load provides a standing wave ratio (SWR) of 1:1 at the given impedance.

Veterinarian-grade mineral oil, an inexpensive form of mineral oil, is frequently used by amateur radio operators as coolant in RF dummy loads.

== Audio ==
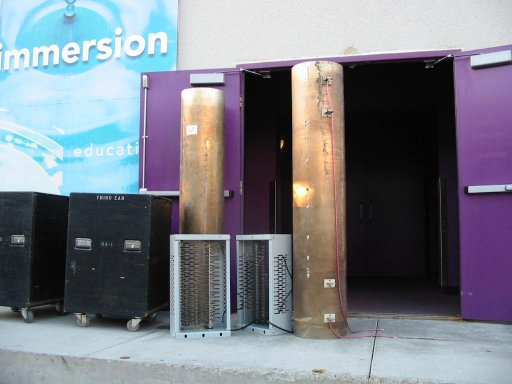
Four heavy duty dummy loads used at an amplifier shootout

When testing audio amplifiers, it is common to replace the loudspeaker with a dummy load, so that the amplifier's handling of large power levels can be tested without actually producing intense sound. The simplest is a resistor bank to simulate the voice coil's resistance.

For loudspeaker simulation, a more complex network is more accurate, however, as actual loudspeakers are reactive and non-linear. There are many designs for loudspeaker simulators, which emphasize different characteristics of the actual speaker, such as the voice coil's inductance, mechanical suspension compliance, and cone mass.

== Power supplies ==
There are also dummy loads for power supplies, known as load banks. These may be used, for example, for factory and in-service testing of standby generators. A load bank may be used to stabilize a power system in case of loss of load, for example, on an isolated wind or mini-hydro plant.

An electronic load (or e-load) is a device or assembly that simulates loading on an electronic circuit. It is used as substitute for a conventional ohmic load resistor.

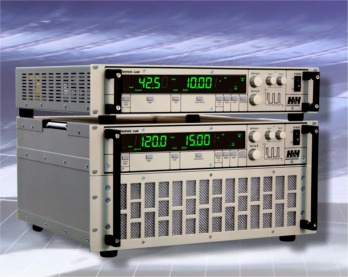
Electronic loads with 800W and 4200W from Höcherl & Hackl

As counterpart to a current source, the electronic load is a current sink. When loading a current source with a fixed resistor one can set one determined load current by the connected load resistor. The characteristic of the electronic load is that the load current can be set and varied in a defined range. The load current is regulated electronically.

The electronic load consumes electric energy and in most cases transforms it into heat. Fans or water-cooled elements are used as coolers. Under certain conditions, energy-recycling into the public power supply system is also possible.

Electronic loads are used in diverse applications, particularly for the test of power supplies, batteries, solar and fuel cells, generators. AC loads are used to test transformers, uninterruptible power supplies (UPS) or onboard power supplies. The equipment and power spectrum of such electronic loads begins with simplest circuits consisting in general of a potentiometer for current setting and a transistor circuit for power transforming. Further developed electronic loads supply several operating modes, in most cases constant current, voltage, power and resistance. Nowadays, the equipment may be controlled by a PLC or remotely by a PC. Settings and measured values such as input voltage and actual load current are indicated on a display.

== See also ==
- Electrical termination
- Electrical impedance
- Grid resistor
