= Mineral oil =

Distillate of petroleum

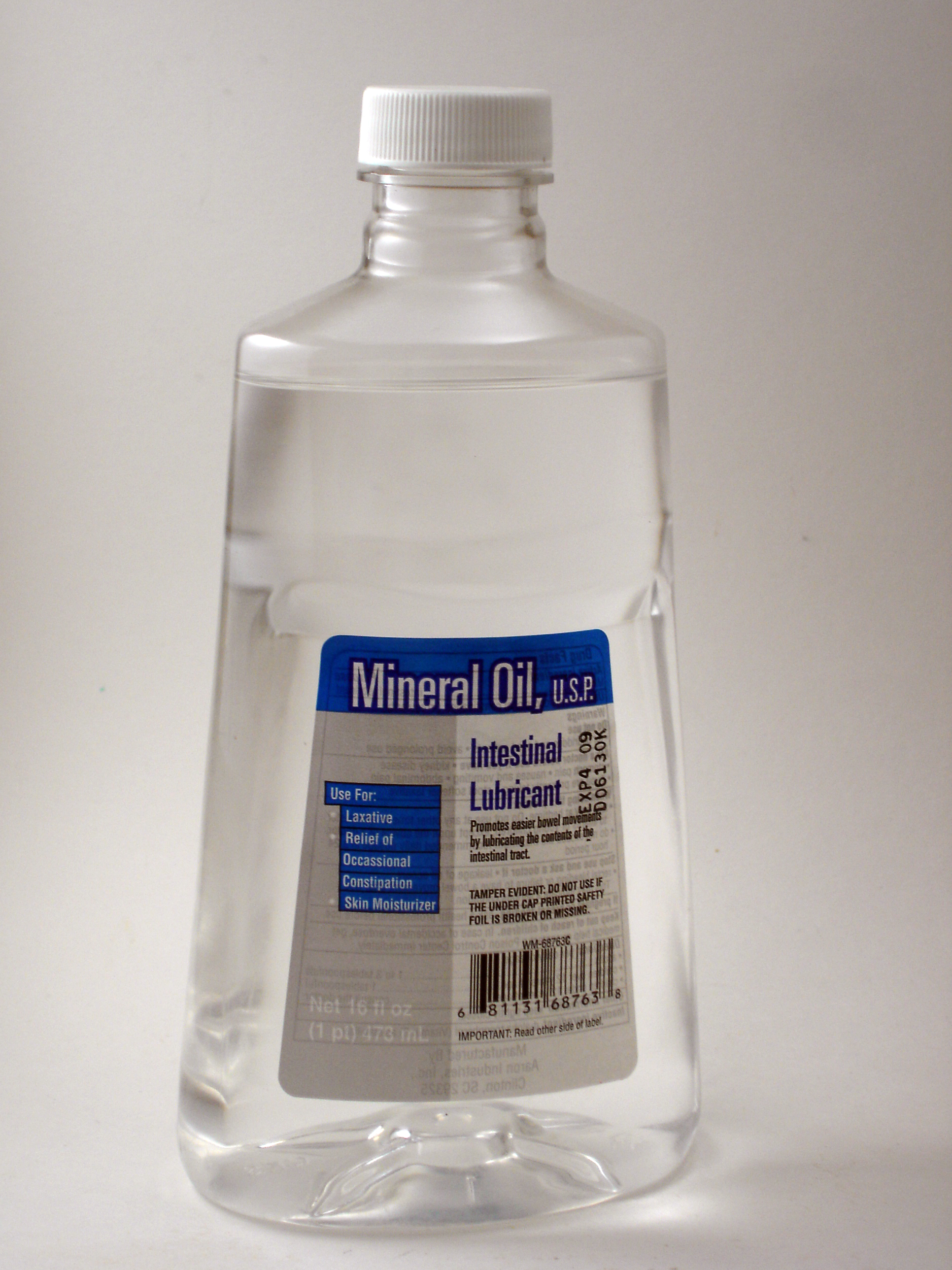
Bottle of mineral oil as sold in United States.

Mineral oil is any of various colorless, odorless, light mixtures of higher alkanes from a mineral source, particularly a distillate of petroleum, as distinct from usually edible vegetable oils.

The name 'mineral oil' by itself is imprecise, having been used for many specific oils since 1771. Other names, similarly imprecise, include 'white oil', 'paraffin oil', 'liquid paraffin' (a highly refined medical grade), paraffinum liquidum (Latin), and 'liquid petroleum'.

Most often, mineral oil is today a liquid obtained from refining crude oil to make gasoline and other petroleum products. Mineral oils used for lubrication are known specifically as base oils. More generally, mineral oil is a transparent, colorless oil, composed mainly of alkanes and cycloalkanes, related to petroleum jelly. It has a density of around 0.8–0.87 g/cm^{3} (0.029–0.031 lb/cu in).

== Nomenclature ==
Some of the imprecision in the definition of the names used for mineral oil (such as 'white oil') reflects usage by consumers and merchants who did not know, and usually had no need of knowing, the oil's precise chemical makeup. Merriam-Webster states the first use of the term "mineral oil" as being 1771. Prior to the late 19th century, the chemical science to determine the makeup of an oil was unavailable in any case. A similar lexical situation occurred with the term "white metal".

"Mineral oil", sold widely and cheaply in the United States, is not sold as such in the United Kingdom. Instead, British pharmacologists use the terms "paraffinum perliquidum" for light mineral oil and "paraffinum liquidum" or "paraffinum subliquidum" for somewhat more viscous varieties. The term "paraffinum liquidum" is often seen on the ingredient lists of baby oil and cosmetics. British aromatherapists commonly use the term "white mineral oil". In lubrication, mineral oils make up Group I, II, and III base oils that are refined from petroleum.

== Toxicology ==
The World Health Organization classifies minimally treated mineral oils as group 1 carcinogens, known to be carcinogenic to humans. Highly refined oils are categorized as group 3, not classifiable as carcinogenic, due to a lack of sufficient evidence.

The UK Food Standards Agency (FSA) carried out a risk assessment on the migration of components from printing inks used on carton-board packaging—including mineral oils—into food in 2011, based on the findings of a survey conducted in the same year. The FSA did not identify any specific food safety concerns due to inks.

People can be exposed to mineral oil mist in the workplace through inhalation, skin contact, or eye contact. In the United States, the Occupational Safety and Health Administration has set the legal limit for mineral oil mist exposure in the workplace as 5 mg/m^{3} (0.0022 gr/cu ft) over an 8-hour workday, the National Institute for Occupational Safety and Health has set a recommended exposure limit of 5 mg/m^{3} (0.0022 gr/cu ft) over an 8-hour workday, with a previous limit of 10 mg/m^{3} (0.0044 gr/cu ft) for short-term exposure rescinded according to the 2019 Guide to Occupational Exposure Values compiled by the ACGIH. Levels of 2,500 mg/m^{3} (1.1 gr/cu ft) and higher are indicated as immediately dangerous to life and health. However, current toxicological data does not contain any evidence of irreversible health effects due to short-term exposure at any level; the current value of 2,500 mg/m^{3} (1.1 gr/cu ft) is indicated as being arbitrary.

== Applications ==
=== Biomedicine ===
==== Laxative ====
Mineral oil is used as a laxative to alleviate constipation by retaining water in stool and the intestines. Although generally considered safe, as noted above, there is a concern of mist inhalation leading to serious health conditions such as pneumonia.

Mineral oil can be administered either orally or rectally. It is sometimes used as a lubricant in enema preparations as most of the ingested material is excreted in the stool rather than being absorbed by the body.

==== Personal lubricant ====
It is recommended by the American Society for Reproductive Medicine for use as a fertility-preserving vaginal lubrication. However, it is known that oils degrade latex condoms.

==== Cell culture ====
Mineral oil of special purity is often used as an overlay covering micro drops of culture medium in petri dishes, during the culture of oocytes and embryos in IVF and related procedures. The use of oil presents several advantages over the open culture system: it allows for several oocytes and embryos to be cultured simultaneously, but observed separately, in the same dish; it minimizes concentration and pH changes by preventing evaporation of the medium; it allows for a significant reduction of the medium volume used (as few as 20 μl (0.0012 cu in) per oocyte instead of several milliliters for the batch culture); and it serves as a temperature buffer minimizing thermal shock to the cells while the dish is taken out of the incubator for observation.

==== Veterinary ====
Over-the-counter veterinarian-use mineral oil is intended as a mild laxative for pets and livestock. Certain mineral oils are used in livestock vaccines, as an adjuvant to stimulate a cell-mediated immune response to the vaccinating agent. In the poultry industry, plain mineral oil can also be swabbed onto the feet of chickens infected with scaly mites on the shank, toes, and webs. Mineral oil suffocates these tiny parasites. In beekeeping, food grade mineral oil-saturated paper napkins placed in hives are used as a treatment for tracheal and other mites. It is also used along with a cotton swab to remove un-shed skin (ashes) on reptiles such as lizards and snakes.

=== Cosmetics ===
Mineral oil is a common ingredient in baby lotions, cold creams, ointments, and cosmetics. It is a lightweight inexpensive oil that is odorless and tasteless. It can be used on eyelashes to prevent brittleness and breaking and, in cold cream, is also used to remove creme make-up and temporary tattoos. One of the common concerns regarding the use of mineral oil is its presence on several lists of comedogenic substances. These lists of comedogenic substances were developed many years ago and are frequently quoted in the dermatological literature.

The type of highly refined and purified mineral oil found in cosmetic and skincare products is noncomedogenic (does not clog pores).

=== Mechanical, electrical, and industrial ===
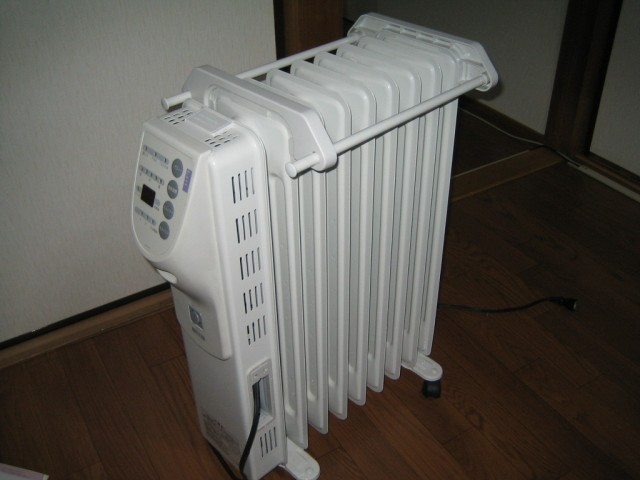
An electrical radiator that uses mineral oil as a heat transfer fluid

Mineral oil is used in a variety of industrial/mechanical capacities as a non-conductive coolant or thermal fluid in electric components, as it does not conduct electricity and functions to displace air and water. Some examples are in transformers, where it is known as transformer oil, and in high-voltage switchgear, where mineral oil is used as an insulator and coolant to disperse switching arcs. Because it is noncompressible, mineral oil is used as a hydraulic fluid in hydraulic machinery and vehicles.

The dielectric constant of mineral oil ranges from 2.3 at 50 °C (122 °F) to 2.1 at 200 °C (392 °F). Electric space heaters sometimes use mineral oil as a heat transfer oil. Lubricants used for older refrigerator and air conditioning compressors are based on mineral oil, especially those using R-22 refrigerant.

Mineral oil is used as a lubricant, a cutting fluid, and as a conditioning oil for jute fibres selected for textile production, a process known as 'jute batching'. Spindle oils are light mineral oils used as lubricants in textile industries.

An often-cited limitation of mineral oil is that it is poorly biodegradable; in some applications, vegetable oils such as cottonseed oil or rapeseed oil may be used instead.

=== Food preparation ===
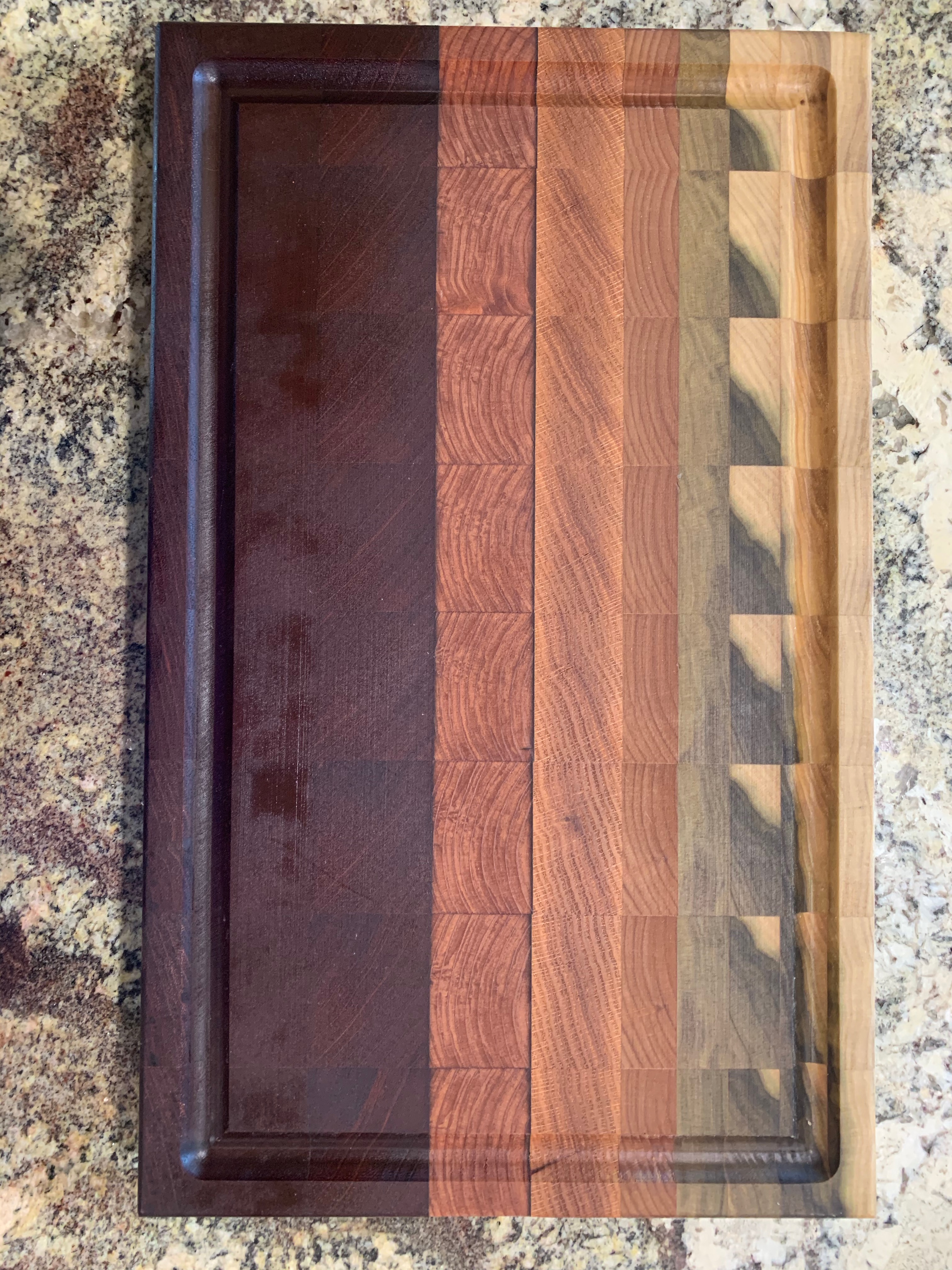
A freshly oiled cutting board

Because of its properties that prevent water absorption, combined with its lack of flavor and odor, food grade mineral oil is a popular preservative for wooden cutting boards, countertops, salad bowls, and utensils. Periodically rubbing a small amount of mineral oil into a wooden kitchen item impedes absorption of food liquids, and thereby food odors, easing the process of hygienically cleaning wooden utensils and equipment. The use of mineral oil to impede water absorption can also prevent cracks and splits from forming in wooden utensils due to wetting and drying cycles. However, some of the mineral oil used on these items, if in contact with food, will be picked up by it and therefore ingested.

Mineral oil is occasionally used in the food industry, particularly for confectionery. In this application, it is typically used for the glossy effect it produces, and to prevent the candy pieces from adhering to each other, such as in Swedish Fish. The use of food grade mineral oil is self-limiting because of its laxative effect, and is not considered a risk in food for any age class. The maximum daily intake is calculated to be about 100 mg (1.5 gr), of which some 80 mg (1.2 gr) are contributed from its use on machines in the baking industry.

=== Insecticide ===
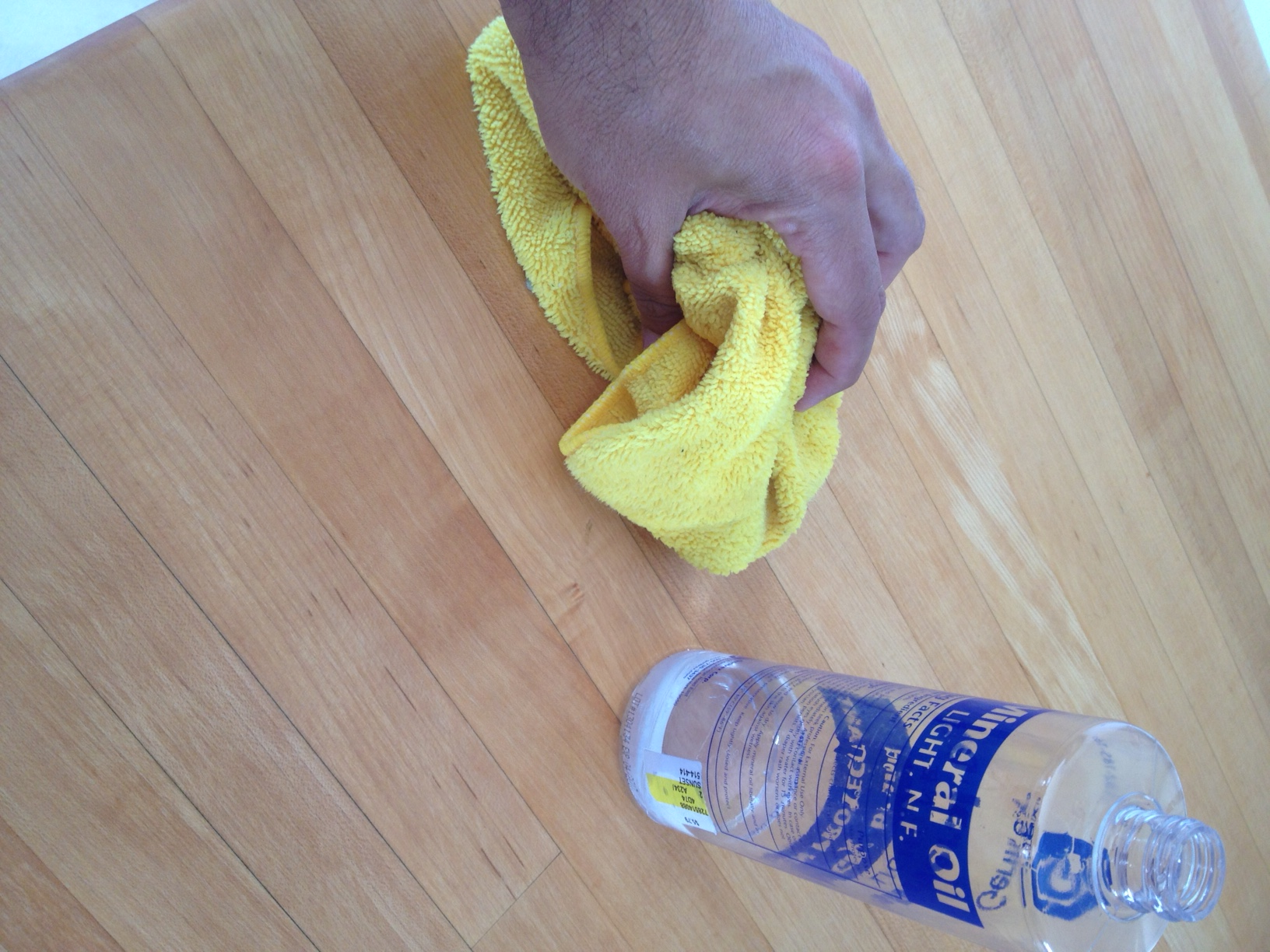
Applying mineral oil to a butcher block counter top

Mineral oil, under various names, is one of the most widely used insecticides. See Horticultural oil.

=== Other uses ===
Mineral oil's ubiquity has led to its use in some niche applications as well:

- It is commonly used to create a wear effect on new clay poker chips, which can otherwise be accomplished only through prolonged use. Either the chips are placed in mineral oil for a short time, or the oil is applied to each chip then wiped off. This removes any chalky residue left-over from manufacture, and also improves the look and feel of the chips.
- Mineral oil is used as the principal fuel in some types of gel-type scented candles.
- It is used for cooling, such as in the liquid submersion cooling of components in some custom-built computers.
- Amateur radio operators frequently use veterinary-grade mineral oil as an inexpensive coolant for RF dummy loads, and as an electrical insulator and / or coolant for extra-high voltage circuitry, such as antenna-simulating "can-tennas". Amateur use of mineral oil follows industrial use, since it typically is the insulating and cooling fluid in large electrical transformers and similar equipment, such as small switches used for high-voltages.
- Mineral oil is used as a brake fluid in some cars, such as Citroën models with hydrodynamic suspension, and bicycle disc brakes.
- Mineral oil is burned in specialized machines (both manufactured and home-made) to produce a thick white smoke that is then blown into automotive evaporative emissions (EVAP) systems to find leaks.
- It is used for polishing alabaster in stonework and lubricating and cleaning pocket knives or food handling tools that use an open bearing, thus needing periodic lubrication. Light mineral oil (paraffinum perliquidum) is used as a honing oil when sharpening edge tools (such as chisels) on abrasive oil stones. Mineral oil USP or light mineral oil can be used as an anti-rust agent for their blades.
- It is an inexpensive alternative for storing reactive metals, such as the alkali metals, lithium, potassium and sodium.
- Horticultural oil is often made with mineral oil as the active ingredient. It is sprayed on plants to control scale, aphid, and other pest populations by suffocation.
- Before the widespread adoption of thermocyclers with heated lids, it was common practice to use mineral oil to overlay polymerase chain reactions in biotechnology to prevent loss of water during heating cycles. It is often used to suspend crystals for use in X-ray crystallography.
- It is used as a transparent collision material for reactions in particle physics, as in the MiniBooNE neutrino oscillation experiment.
- As a relatively low heat combustible with no flavor or odor, mineral oil can be used in entertainments for fire breathing and "fire dancing" act, but there is a risk of injury.
- Paraffin oil is commonly used to fill Galileo thermometers: Due to paraffin oil's freezing temperature being lower than that of water (approx. −4 °C (24 °F)), this makes them less susceptible to freezing during shipment, or when stored in a cold environment.

== See also ==
- Oil analysis
- Penetrating oil
