= Single-pass bore finishing =

Single-pass bore finishing is a machining process similar to honing to finish a bore, but the tool makes only a single pass. The process was originally developed to improve bore quality in cast iron workpieces.

== Process ==
This process uses multiple diamond-plated, barrel-shaped tools to finish a bore. Each tool has a single layer of diamonds bonded to it, with about half of each diamond exposed. These tools are manufactured to a specific diameter and are intended only to enlarge the hole to that size.

The tools are usually mounted in a dedicated bore finishing machine, however they can also be mounted in a milling machine. In either case the tool, workpiece, or both are rotated and the tool is plunged into the bore and removed. The part is then transferred to the next station or a larger tool is mounted and a larger bore machined, and the process repeated until the desired bore geometry is reached. The number of tools required to achieve the desired bore size is dependent on the workpiece material, the amount of stock to be removed and geometrical requirements, with four to six tool pieces being common. Each tool is progressively larger than the last, but in diminishing increments; as the stock removal is reduced, so is the tool's diamond grit size.

The process is similar to honing, in that the tool follows the existing center line of the bore. To make sure the tool follows the existing center line, the tool, workpiece, or both are allowed to float. Usually just the workpiece is floated, but both pieces may be floated to get the tightest tolerances, however this greatly increases complexity. For workpieces that are larger than approximately 1 kg (2.2 lb) it may be more feasible to float the tool. The process can achieve a size tolerance of 0.001 mm (3.9×10^{−5} in) and a geometry tolerance of 0.0003 mm (1.2×10^{−5} in) in production.

=== Machine tool ===
Single-pass bore finishing is not usually done in a milling machine for several reasons. Firstly, most milling machines have only one spindle, so changing the tool more than four to six times can increase cycle times significantly. Secondly, most workpieces that require this process are made on horizontal machining centers (HMC), which reduces float-ability due to gravity. Thirdly, the lubrication may not be sufficient, which can lead to material build-up between diamonds, diminishing the tool's effectiveness. Finally, if any chips remain from previous operations they can ruin the tool.

Instead, typically a dedicated machine tool is used. It has four to eight spindles and usually a rotary table. The cycle time for this type of setup is determined by the longest individual operation, which in this situation is determined by how long it takes to plunge and retract the tool through the bore. Throughput can be increased by completing two workpieces on each cycle; this is achieved by having two identical stations for each tool size so that two workpieces can be operated on concurrently.

== Advantages and disadvantages ==
There is little downtime due to tool changes because tools usually last from tens of thousands of passes to over a million. The perishable tool cost can be as low as a 0.01 USD per bore for very large quantity runs. To make the process cost effective minimum runs would be on the order of one to two hundred parts with several runs each year.

Single-pass bore finishing is not well suited for blind holes because the tool has a tapered lead on it which prevents the bottom of the hole from being finished. The process can be performed on blind holes, but it requires an alternative tool design and suitable manufacturing conditions. A better alternative is ID grinding.

Commonly processed materials include soft and hard steels, aluminum, bronze, brass, ceramics, and chrome. Note that gummy grades of stainless steel, aluminum, and all but the hardest grades of plastic are much tougher for this process. The gumminess problem can be overcome with special oil based cutting fluids. Also, the process does not work well on thin-walled workpieces owing to a tendency to expand when the tool is inserted.

This method of bore finishing is better suited for bores with relatively low length-to-diameter ratios, usually less than 2:1. However, if there are cross-holes, or other interruptions in the bore, then a ratio greater than 2:1 is possible, because swarf and fluids may be expelled via these routes. This process is also not well suited for surfaces that require cross-hatching.
