= Horizontal boring machine =

Machine tool used to perform boring operations

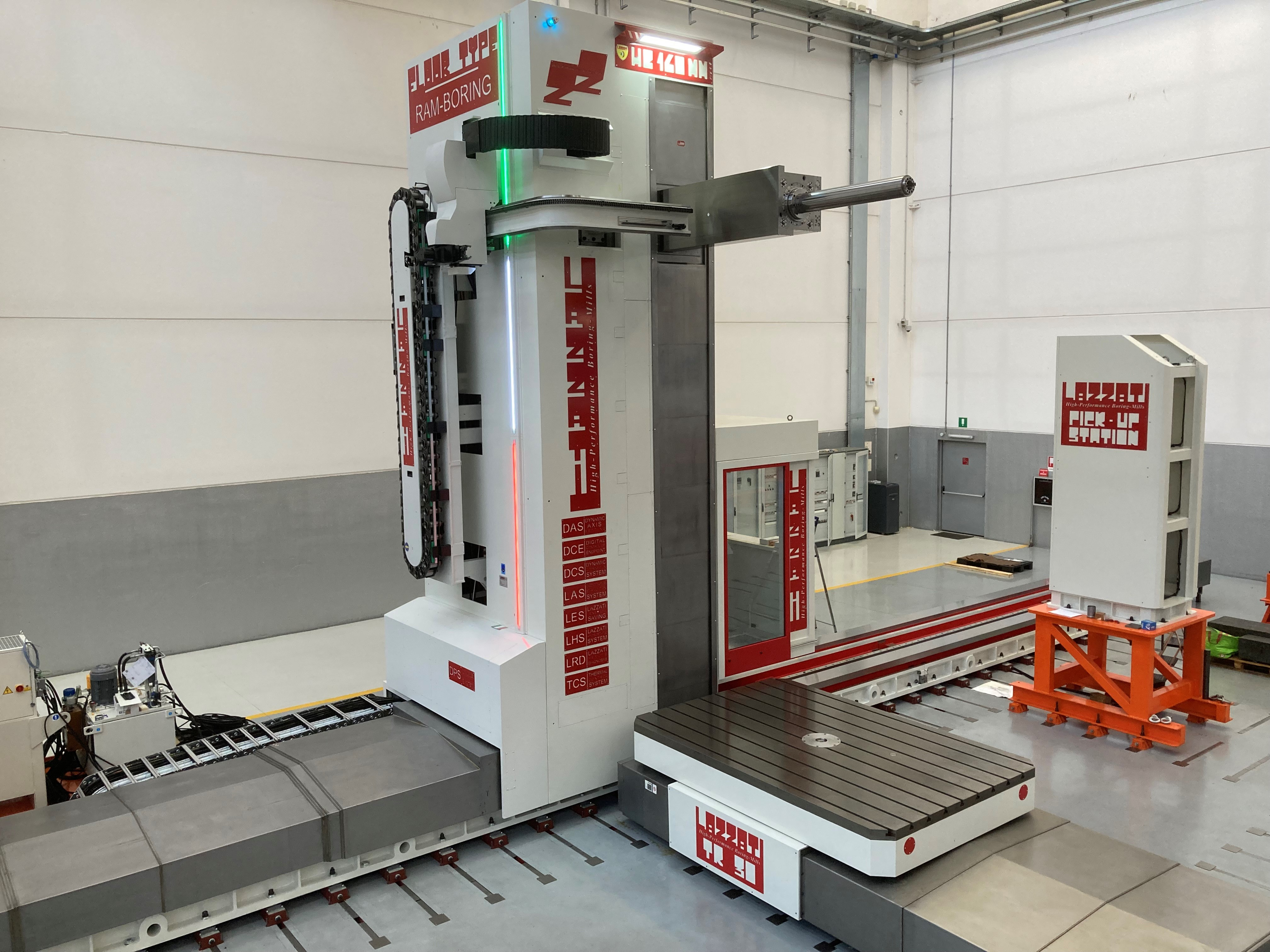
Floor-Type Horizontal Boring Mill producer LAZZATI model HB 160MM Evo4.0 with rotary travelling table, automatic tool changer and automatic head changer

A horizontal boring machine is a machine tool used to enlarge an already drilled or cast hole with high precision. It ensures the required diameter, coaxiality, and concentricity within very tight tolerances, often up to the micrometer level in high-precision boring machines.

== History ==
The first boring machine was created by John Wilkinson in 1775. The term "boring" comes from the Old French alaisier, meaning "to widen," which itself derives from the Latin latus, meaning "wide."

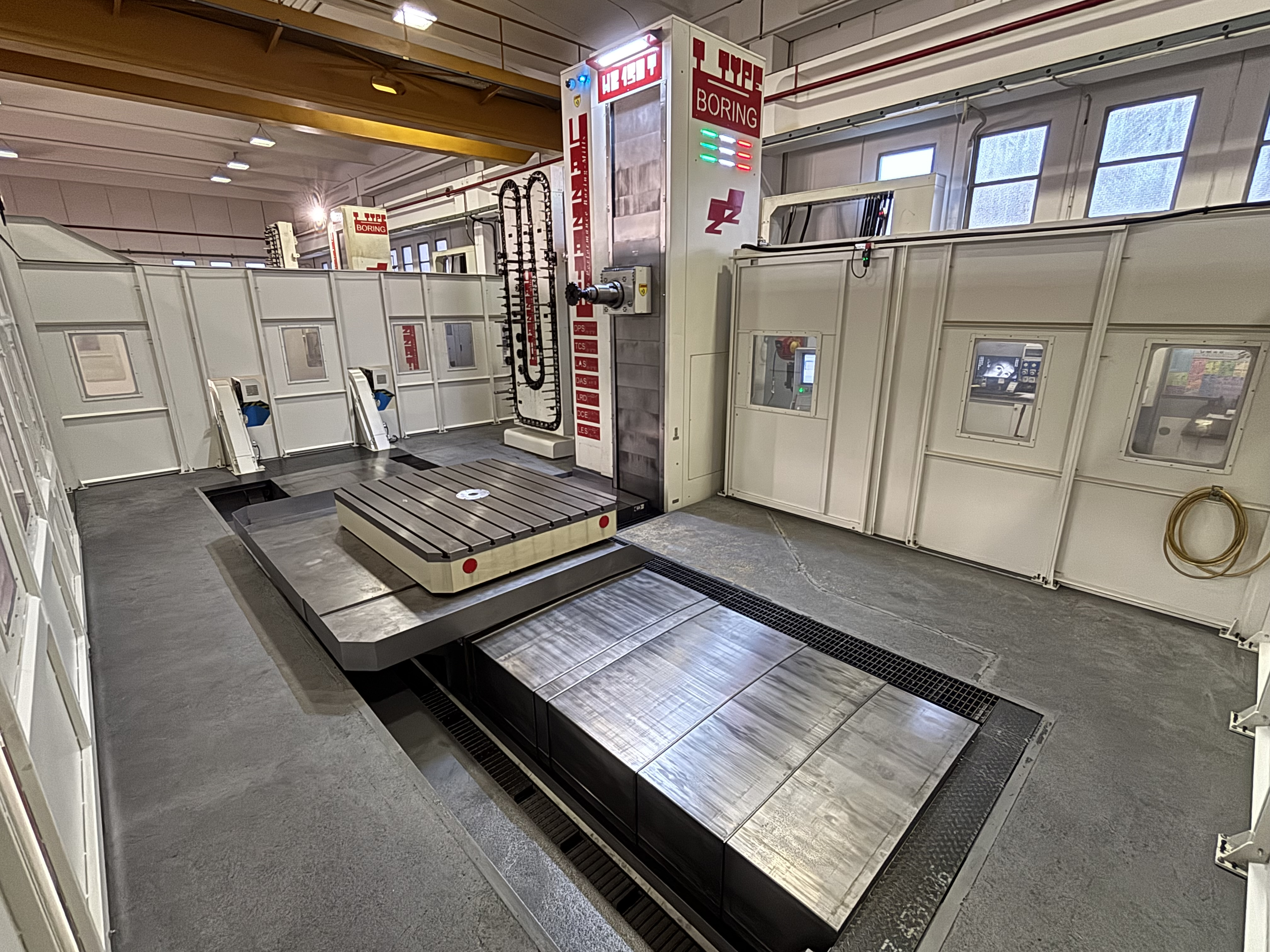
Example of Table Type Boring Mill producer LAZZATI model HB 150T Evo4.0 installed at a final user in foundation and completed by full protection guards

Boring technology was further developed in the 19th century as a method to improve the machining of industrial machine components. Early boring machines were manually operated, but with advancements in automation and Computer Numerical Control (CNC), modern boring machines now offer unparalleled precision and efficiency.

== How It Works ==
A boring machine operates by rotating a cutting tool while the workpiece remains stationary or moves along a guided axis. The main movements involved in boring are:

- Cutting motion (rotary movement): Performed by the tool, known as a boring bar.
- Feed motion (linear movement): Can be applied either to the workpiece (on a moving table) or to the tool (on a mobile column or gantry).

CNC-controlled boring machines allow for automatic adjustments, ensuring high repeatability and minimal operator intervention.

== Types of Horizontal Boring Machines ==
Horizontal boring machines are classified based on the morphology of the structure and their intended application:

- Planer (T-Type) Type: This type features a moving column or headstock that allows for multi-directional machining. It is versatile and used for complex machining tasks.
- Table (Universal) Type: The workpiece is mounted on a moving table that travels along the X and W axes while the spindle performs the cutting operations. This is the most common type, widely used in general machining applications.
- Floor Type: Designed for machining very large and heavy components, the floor type boring machine has a stationary workpiece while the spindle and tooling move along multiple axes to perform operations.

== CNC Horizontal Boring Machines ==
Modern boring machines are equipped with Computer Numerical Control (CNC), allowing for automated, repeatable, and highly precise machining. These machines integrate advanced systems such as:

- Hydrostatic guides for reduced friction and increased accuracy.
- Automatic tool changers to optimize production.
- Active stabilization systems to compensate for thermal expansion and vibrations.
- Adaptive machining technologies, and real-time monitoring systems.

Used in high-precision industries, including aerospace, energy, and defense.

== CNC Technology and Productivity Improvements ==
The introduction of CNC technology has transformed boring machines, offering:

- Greater Precision: Capable of maintaining tolerances in the micrometer range.
- Repeatability and Consistency: Ensures identical results in mass production.
- Automation: Reduces setup times and enables unattended operation.
- Versatility: Can perform multiple machining tasks beyond boring, such as milling, drilling, and threading.
- Error Reduction: Eliminates human inconsistencies, improving reliability.

== Industrial Applications ==
Boring machines are used in a wide range of industrial applications, including:

- Automotive Industry: Machining of engine components and suspension parts.
- Aerospace Industry: Precision machining of aircraft structural components.
- Naval and Railway Industry: Large-scale boring of structural elements and engines.
- Medical and Precision Instrumentation: Used for surgical instruments and medical devices.

== Boring vs. Milling: Key Differences ==
Unlike milling machines, which primarily remove material from a workpiece’s surface, boring machines specialize in internal hole finishing.

Boring machines often incorporate a spindle quill, allowing for deep-hole machining with minimal deflection—providing superior precision compared to standard milling operations.

== Advantages of Boring Machines ==
- High Precision: Ensures extremely tight tolerances and superior surface finish.
- Flexibility: Can handle various hole diameters and material types.
- Efficiency: CNC automation reduces machining time and increases productivity.

== Major Manufacturers ==
Well-known manufacturers of boring machines include Lazzati, Pama, FPT, Bragonzi, and SMT(Skoda), which specialize in high-performance machine tools for industrial applications. Italian machine tool manufacturers are globally recognized for their innovation and quality. Commonly Lazzati, Pama and SMT(Skoda) are recognized as top class hydrostatic horizontal boring mill manufacturers worldwide.

== See also ==
- Milling Machine
- Lathe
- Machine Tool
- CNC Machining
- Hydrostatics
