= Sharpener =

A sharpener is a tool for sharpening. It may refer to:

- Knife sharpener, a tool for sharpening a knife
  - Sharpening steel, a tool for aligning the edge of a knife, usually a kitchen knife
  - Sharpening stone, a tool for sharpening a bladed or edged tool, such a knife
- Pencil sharpener, a tool for sharpening a pencil
- Sharpening jig, a tool for sharpening a woodworking tool

== See also ==
- Knifegrinder, a trade or occupation
