= Oilstone =

Oilstone may refer to

- Sharpening stone
- USAF/CIA operation OILSTONE
- Oil shale
