= Honing oil =

Liquid, solution or emulsion used to aid in the cutting or grinding of metal

Honing oil is a liquid, solution or emulsion used to aid in the cutting or grinding of metal, typically by abrasive tools or stones, and may or may not contain oil. It can also be called machining oil, tool oil, cutting fluid, and cutting oil.

In the context of hand blade sharpening, honing oil is used on a sharpening stone to protect the stone, carry away the debris (swarf), and to more efficiently produce a keen edge on a metal blade such as a knife. In a machine shop it also carries away excess heat and depending on composition, may prevent unintentional tearing and welding of the metal. Or when used with materials such as soft copper, it may have extra additives to prevent stone loading, or metal deactivators to prevent staining of copper containing alloys. To achieve maximum cutting rates and abrasive life with petroleum (mineral) based machining oils when honing difficult materials like stainless steel, a higher level of surface active lubricity agents are combined with sulfur extreme pressure additives. Industrial honing oil is typically available in large quantities, home knife honing oils in small bottles.

== Background ==
There are many different kinds of honing oils to suit different needs. It is important to use the appropriate solution for the job. In the case of knife sharpening, motor oil is too thick or heavy and can over-lubricate or clog a sharpening stone, whereas WD-40 is too light an oil and will not carry the metal filings plus stone dust (collectively known as swarf) away from the stone, and clog it. Not using any oil at all will also clog or glaze the stone, again reducing its cutting power. Historically sperm whale oil, Neatsfoot oil, and other animal fats were popular.

Oils were once exclusively used in part because the high carbon steels of the time, such as 1095, could rust using simple water-based solutions, and the term honing "oil" is used today even for water based honing solutions.

Commercial honing oil, light sewing machine oil or, in a pinch, heavier oil thinned with paint thinner (white spirit) or kerosine is suggested by veteran Swedish wood carver Wille Sundqvist. He further suggests "Kerosine alone works well on fine, hard stones."

== Composition ==
The two most common classes of honing oil are petroleum based (typically mineral oils), and non-petroleum (typically water or vegetable oil or animal, such as neats foot oil or whale oil) based. Common additives include chlorine, sulfur, rust inhibitors, and detergents.

Honing oil has just the right consistency for sharpening stones. It will not gum it up nor glaze it, and it will provide just enough lubrication to avoid wearing out the stone prematurely. Importantly, it is also used to "float" off generated swarf and thereby prevent clogging of the sharpening stone, which would diminish its future cutting ability.
