= F. Dick =

German cutlery manufacturer

- Company type: Limited partnership
- Industry: Kitchenware
- Founded: 1778; 248 years ago
- Headquarters: Deizisau, Germany
- Key people: Wilhelm Leuze, CEO
- Products: Kitchen knives, Butcher knives, accessories, tools, Sharpening steels
- Owner: Wilhelm Leuze
- Number of employees: about 240
- Website: www.dick.de

Friedr. DICK is a German cutlery manufacturer founded 1778 in Esslingen, Germany. Known by their logo name of F. Dick, the company has three lines of business. F. Dick specializes primarily in butcher's knives and tools, where it is regarded as a market leader in both Europe and North America. The company is known for its wide range of high quality sharpening steels and is also renowned for its chef's knives where it is a respected manufacturer in the professional sector, but less established for the casual user. Although F. Dick cutlery is available for purchase in the American market, the brand has not caught-on with mainstream American consumers. As a result, the brand is limited in its availability, and is generally only available at cutlery specialty-stores in the American market.

F. Dick also manufactures industrial grade and kitchen grade sharpening solutions. These range from advanced semi-automated wet-grinding machines to honing-steels.

F. Dick is mentioned by name in Anthony Bourdain's Kitchen Confidential. Specifically, he notes the offset serrated knife that is manufactured by the company.

== History ==
Johann Friedrich Dick founded the company in 1778 to manufacture files. It continued in the manufacture of files as its main product line until 1873, when Paul Friedrich Dick took over the company and began the production of sharpening steels.

One hundred years after the founding of the company, a factory in Esslingen began construction. At that time the company had 20 employees. In 1881, company's and Germany's first file production machine was commissioned. In 1889, Friedr. Dick built a new factory in Kollwitz/Fleischmannstrasse in Esslingen, employing 100 people and expanding the product line to include knives for butchers and chefs, cleavers and other specialized tools. Files manufactured ranged from the smallest watchmaker's file to the largest (over 45 cm in length) square file. In 1997, the F. Dick company moved to a new headquarters in Deizisau, Germany. The old factory in Esslingen is now a class listed monument and the town's landmark.

== Brand names ==
- DICKORON Sharpening steels utilizing sapphire surfaces for both honing and sharpening.
- ErgoGrip Butcher knives
- MasterGrip Butcher knives
- MagicGrip Special deboning knives
- ExpertGrip 2K Butcher knives for professionals
- Rapid Steel/Magneto Steel/Silver Steel/Master Steel Non-traditional sharpening/honing steel
- Multicut Specialty steel for butchers
- DICK 2000 Specialty steel for butchers
- 1778 Jubilee series
- 1893 Damascus series
- 1905 Design series
- Premier WACS Forged knife series with hygienic non-stick coating
- Premier Plus Professional grade, forged kitchen knives
- Red Spirit Professional grade, Asian-style series with red handle
- ActiveCut Professional grade, forged kitchen knives
- Superior Professional grade, stamped kitchen knives
- ProDynamic Professional grade, lightweight polymer handled, stamped kitchen knives
- Von den Steinen Circular machine knives, saws
