= Razor strop =

Device for straightening and polishing blades

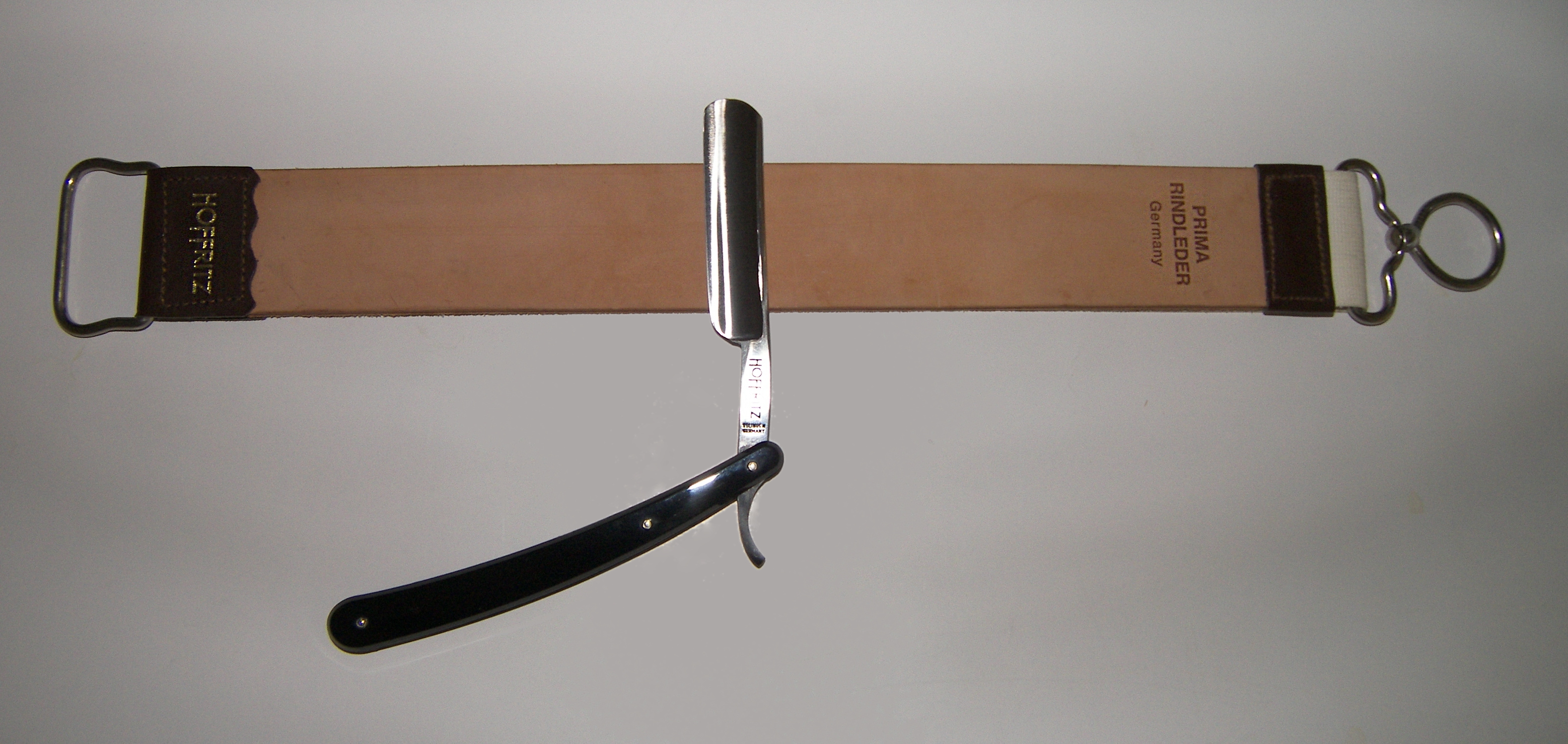
A straight razor with a hanging strop

A razor strop or simply a strop (sometimes called a razor strap or strap) is a flexible strip of leather, canvas, denim fabric, balsa wood, or other soft material, used to straighten and polish the blade of a straight razor, a knife, or a woodworking tool such as a chisel. In many cases stropping re-aligns parts of the blade edge that have been bent out of alignment. In other cases, especially when an abrasive polishing compound is used, stropping may remove a small amount of metal (functionally equivalent to lapping). Stropping can also burnish the blade, smoothing the surface and enhancing its shine.

The strop may be a hanging strop, a block (placed on a table, or in ones hand), or a hand-held paddle. Various abrasive compounds may be applied to the strop to aid in polishing the blade while stropping to obtain a mirror-like finish. Common abrasive compounds include diamonds, chromium(III) oxide, aluminum oxide, and iron(III) oxide.

== Use ==
Stropping is traditionally associated with straight razors used for shaving, as these are the thinnest blades in everyday use, and therefore require frequent stropping. Kitchen knives may be straightened on a honing steel if less sharpness is acceptable. In principle, any blade may be polished by stropping. Custom strops are made to hone irregularly-shaped tools, such as chisels or gouges, and nearly any piece of smooth leather or heavy fabric infused with abrasive compound may be used for stropping.

== See also ==
- Knife sharpening
- Sharpening
- Sharpening stone
