= Knife sharpening =

Process of grinding a knife against a hard surface

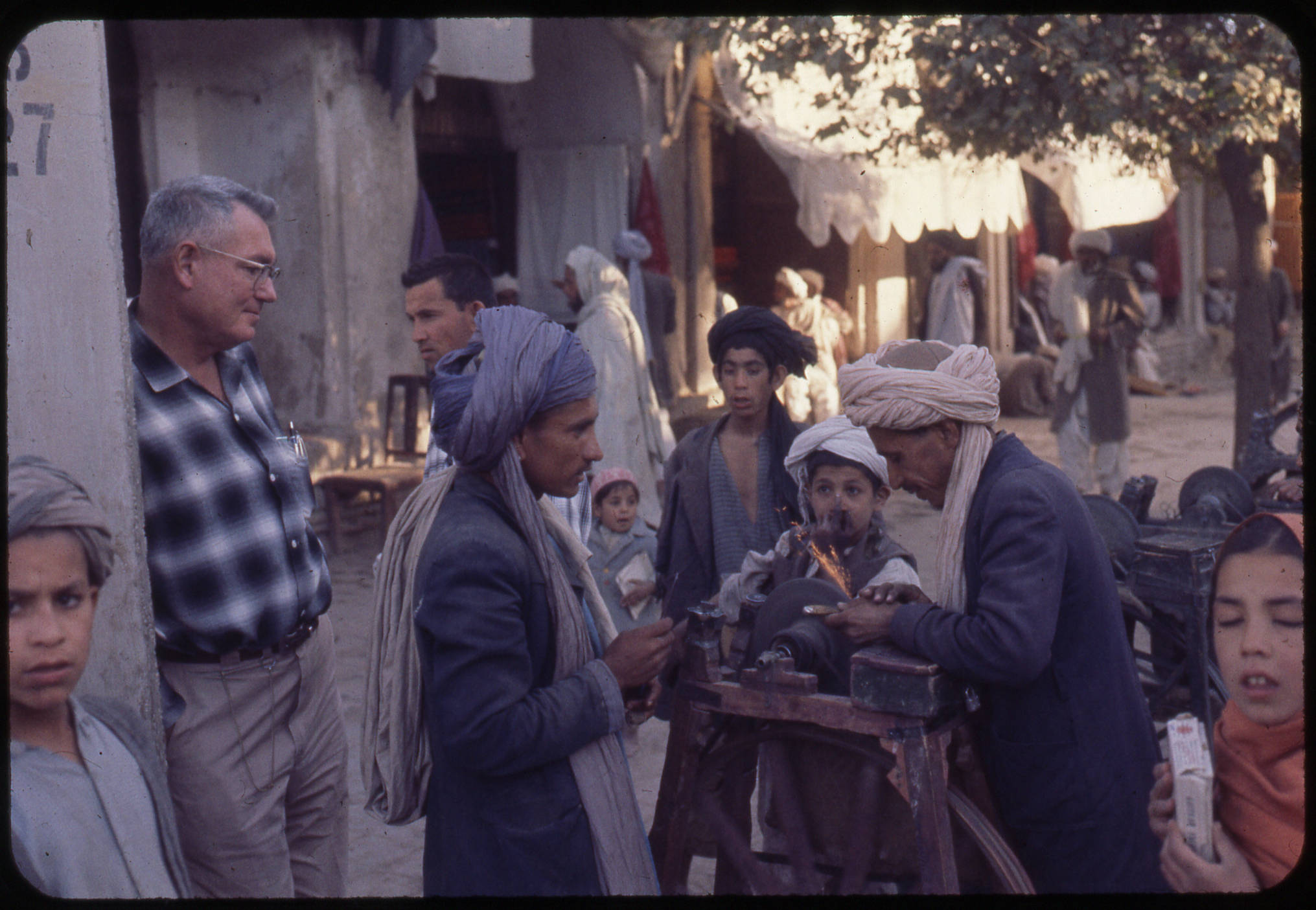
Knife sharpener in Kabul, Afghanistan (1961)

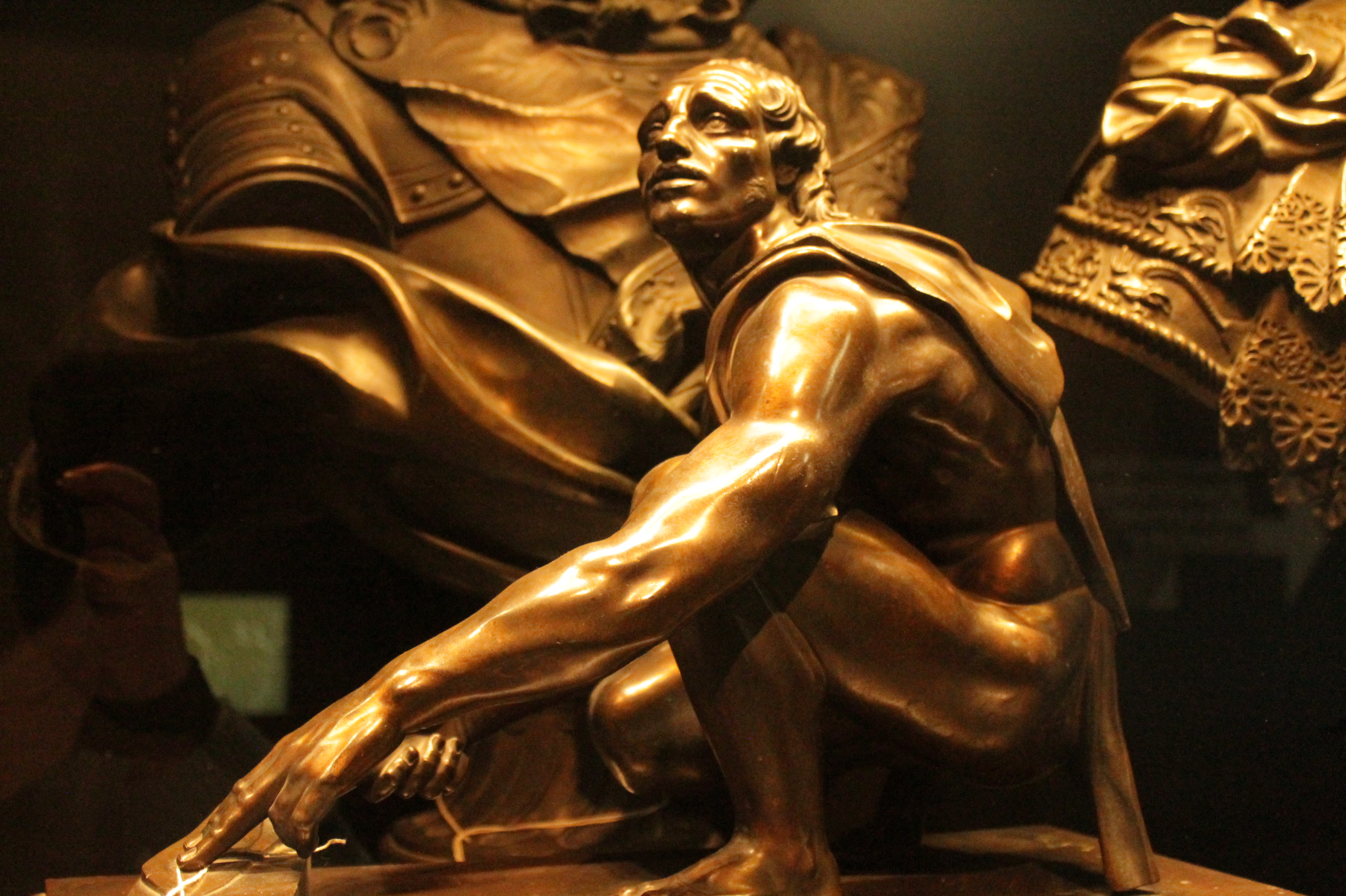
The Knife Grinder by Massimiliano Soldani (c.1700), Albertinum, Dresden

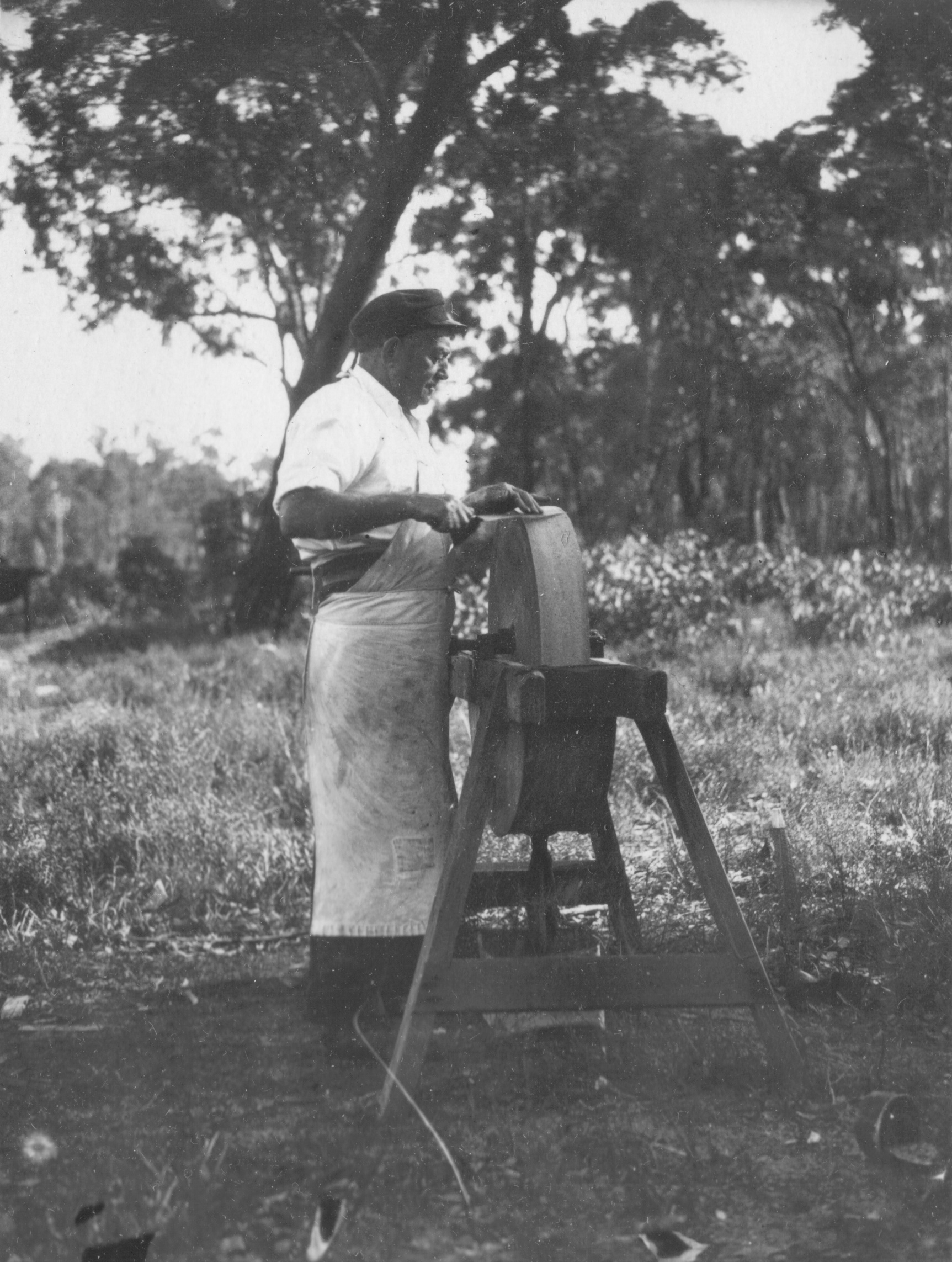
A railway camp cook sharpens a knife blade on a stone wheel, 1927

Knife sharpening is the process of making a knife or similar tool sharp by grinding against a hard, rough surface, typically a stone, or a flexible surface with hard particles, such as sandpaper. Additionally, a leather razor strop, or strop, is often used to straighten and polish an edge. The trade or occupation is called knifegrinder or knife sharpener.

== Overview ==
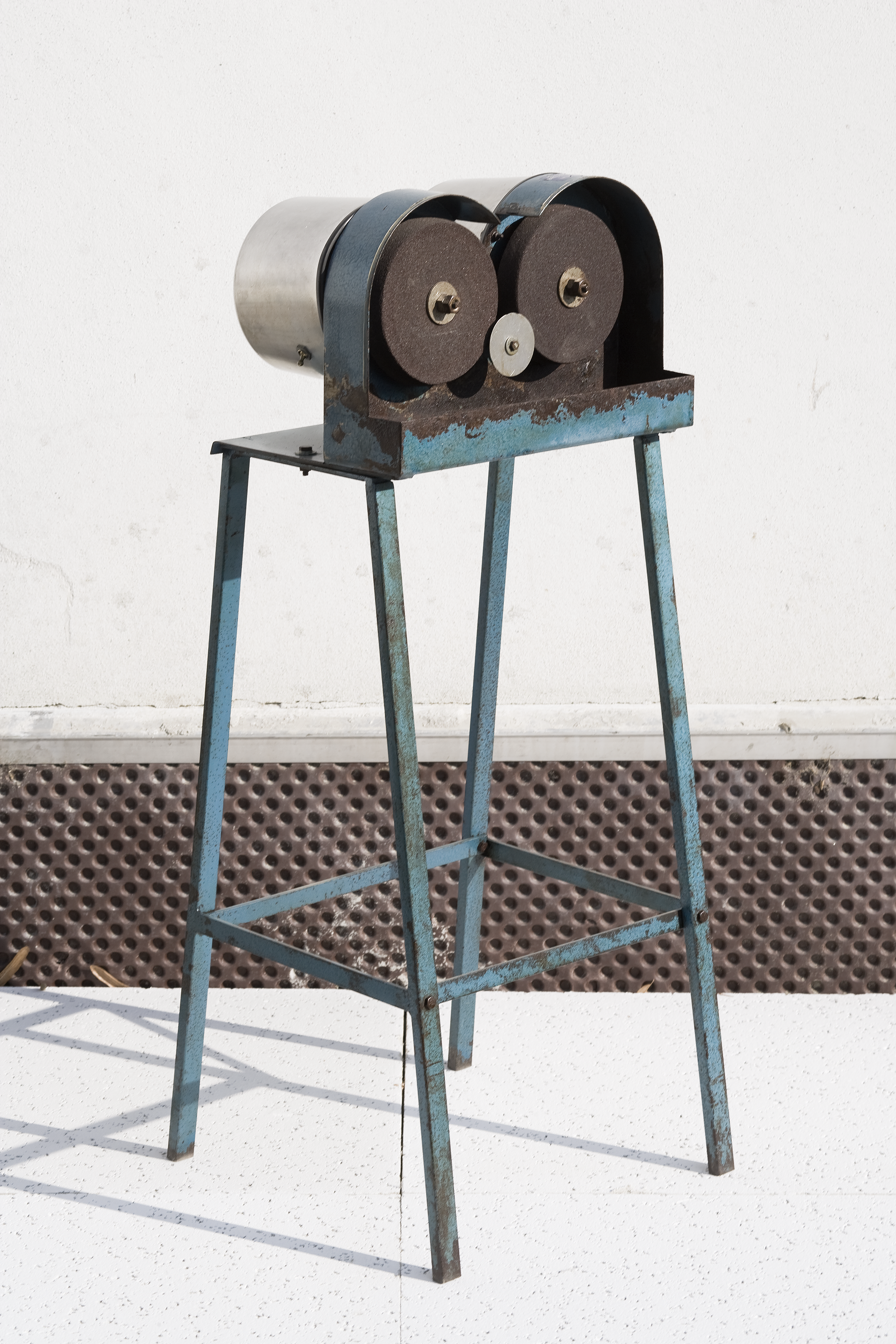
Electric knife sharpener

The smaller the angle between the blade and the stone, the sharper the knife will be, but the less side force is needed to bend the edge over or chip it off. The angle between the blade and the stone is the edge angle – the angle from the vertical to one of the knife edges, and equals the angle at which the blade is held. The total angle from one side to the other is called the included angle – on a symmetric double-ground edge (a wedge shape), the angle from one edge to the other is thus twice the edge angle. Typical edge angles are about 20° (making the included angle 40° on a double-ground edge). The edge angle for very sharp knives can be as little as 10 degrees (for a 20° included angle). Knives that require a tough edge (such as those that chop) may sharpen at 25° or more.

Different knives are sharpened differently according to grind (edge geometry) and application. For example, surgical scalpels are extremely sharp but fragile, and are generally disposed of, rather than sharpened, after use. Straight razors used for shaving must cut with minimal pressure, and thus must be very sharp with a small angle and often a hollow grind. Typically these are stropped daily or more often. Kitchen knives are less sharp, and generally cut by slicing rather than just pressing, and are steeled daily. At the other extreme, an axe for chopping wood will be less sharp still, and is primarily used to split wood by chopping, not by slicing, and may be reground but will not be sharpened daily. In general, but not always, the harder the material to be cut, the higher (duller) the angle of the edge.

The composition of the stone affects the sharpness of the blade (a finer grain, usually, though not always, produces sharper blades), as does the composition of the blade (some metals take and keep an edge better than others). For example, Western kitchen knives are usually made of softer steel and take an edge angle of 20–22°, while East Asian kitchen knives are traditionally of harder steel and take an edge angle of 15–18°. The Western-style kitchen knives are generally in the range of 52–58 on the Rockwell scale, which denotes the relative hardness of a material.

== Method ==
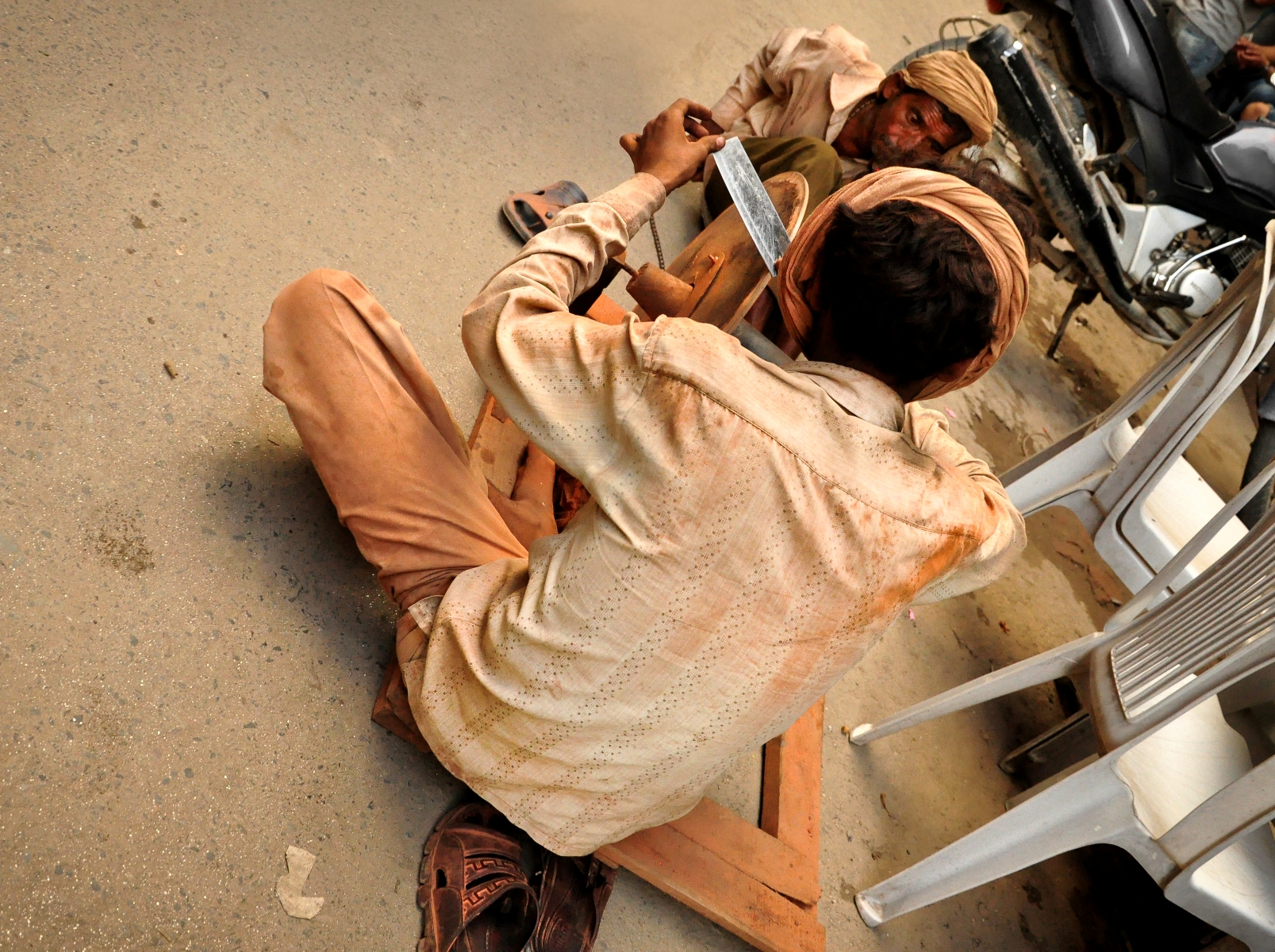
Two professional knife sharpeners in streets of Kathmandu

Knife sharpening with 14th-century methods

Knife sharpening proceeds in several stages, in order from coarsest (most destructive) to finest (most delicate). These may be referred to either by the effect or by the tool. Naming by effect, the stages are:

1. sharpening: removing metal to form a new edge
  1. rough sharpening (using either water stones, oil stones, or medium grits of sandpaper)
  2. fine sharpening (using the same tools as above, but in finer grits)
2. straightening: straightening the existing metal on the blade, but not removing significant quantities of metal
3. polishing (also called stropping): giving a mirror finish, but not significantly altering the edge.
  - polishing may also be achieved by buffing a blade: instead of moving the knife against a flat leather strop loaded with fine abrasive, the knife is held still and a powered circular cloth wheel is moved against the knife.

Named by tools, the same three stages are:

1. grinding (on a grinding wheel) or whetting (on a whetstone)
2. steeling, using a honing steel
3. stropping, on a razor strop or buffing on a wheel

The word "honing" is ambiguous, and may refer to either fine sharpening (step 1.2) or straightening (step 2).

The finest level of sharpening is done most frequently, while the coarser levels are done progressively more rarely, and sharpening methods differ between blades and applications.

For example, a straight razor used for shaving is stropped before each use, and may be stropped part-way through use, while it will be fine sharpened on a stone a few times per year, and re-ground on a rough stone after several years.

By contrast, a kitchen knife is steeled before or after each use (and may be steeled during heavy use, as by butchers), and sharpened on a stone a few times per year.

=== Blade damage ===
Blades are damaged primarily by buckling – compressive force, from being pressed into a hard object, such as bone, ice, or a hard cutting board – and by bending, from sideways pressure. Both of these tend to roll the edge of a blade, due to the metal's ductile nature.

Blades may also be damaged by being corroded by acid (as when cutting lemons or tomatoes) or by high temperatures and corrosive chemicals in a dishwasher.

If a knife is used as a scraper, a pry-bar, or encounters hard particles in softer materials, there may be a sideways load at the tip, causing bending damage.

Blade damage is avoided by:

- using an appropriate blade for the task – a thinner blade for more delicate work, and a thicker blade whenever a thinner blade is not required (e.g. a thinner blade might be used to cut fillets, butterfly steak or roast for stuffing, or perform Mukimono, while a thicker one might be used to slice or chop repeatedly, separate primal cuts of poultry or small game, or scrape and trim fat from meat or hide, as these actions would be more likely to cause unnecessary wear on a thinner blade.)
- using a soft cutting surface,
- straight cutting, with no side-to-side movement,
- immediate cleaning.
- oiling (with food grade oil if appropriate)

=== Inspection ===
Blade sharpness can be checked in multiple ways.

Visually, a very sharp knife has an edge that is too small to see with the eye; it may even be hard or impossible to focus in a microscope. The shape near the edge can be highlighted by rotating the knife and watching changes in reflection. Nicks and rolled edges can also be seen, as the rolled edge provides a reflective surface, while a properly straightened edge will be invisible when viewed head-on.

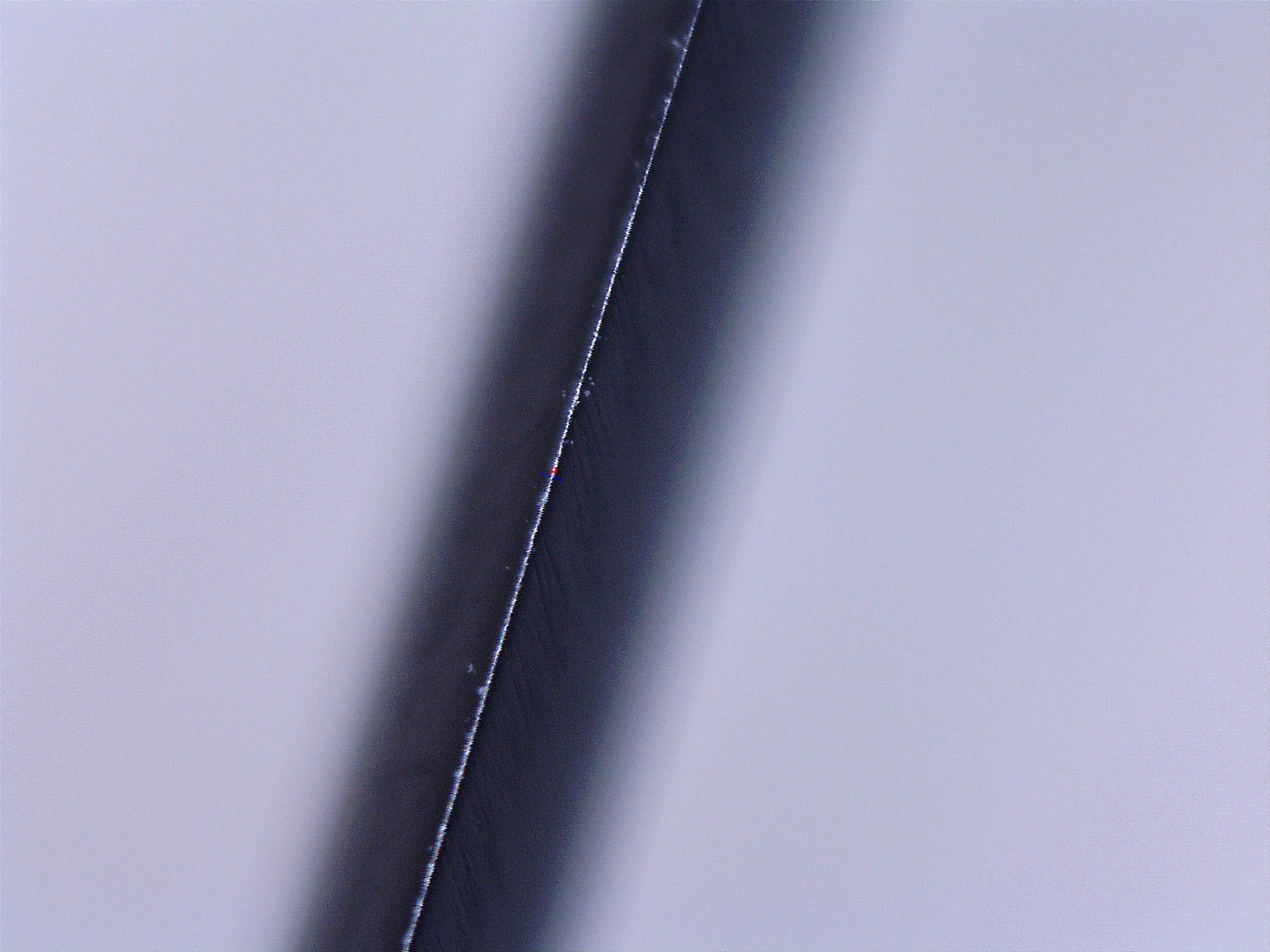
Edge of a knife after sharpening and stropping. Although this edge is sharp enough to bite a thumbnail, cut paper smoothly, or shave arm hair, the microscope plainly shows an edge which reflects light back into the lens. A truly sharp edge is too thin to reflect significant light.

By touch, a blade can be checked by running a thumb across the blade (perpendicular to the edge – not along, which will cut it). A sharp blade will have a distinct edge, like a corner, and may sing slightly from vibration, while a dull blade will have a round edge and the thumb will slip over it.

A blade's sharpness may be tested by checking if it "bites"—begins to cut by being drawn across an object without pressure. Specialized sticks exist to check bite, though one can also use a soft ballpoint pen, such as the common white Bic Stic. A thumbnail may be used at the risk of a cut, or the edge of a sheet of paper. For kitchen knives, various vegetables may be used to check bite, notably carrots, tomatoes, or cucumbers. In testing in this way, any nicks are felt as obstacles. A blade polished to a finer edge (greater than 3000 grit or so), although technically sharper, can have a harder time initiating cuts on soft vegetables or fruits with a skin, such as tomatoes or bell peppers, due to the lack of micro-serrations on the apex of the knife. These micro-serrations can decrease the effort needed to initiate cuts by tearing the food on a microscopic level.

"Biting" sharpness is considered ideal for kitchen knives, but sharper blades are desired for shaving and surgical scalpels, which must cut without side-to-side slicing of the blade, and duller but tougher blades are more suitable for chiseling and chopping wood.

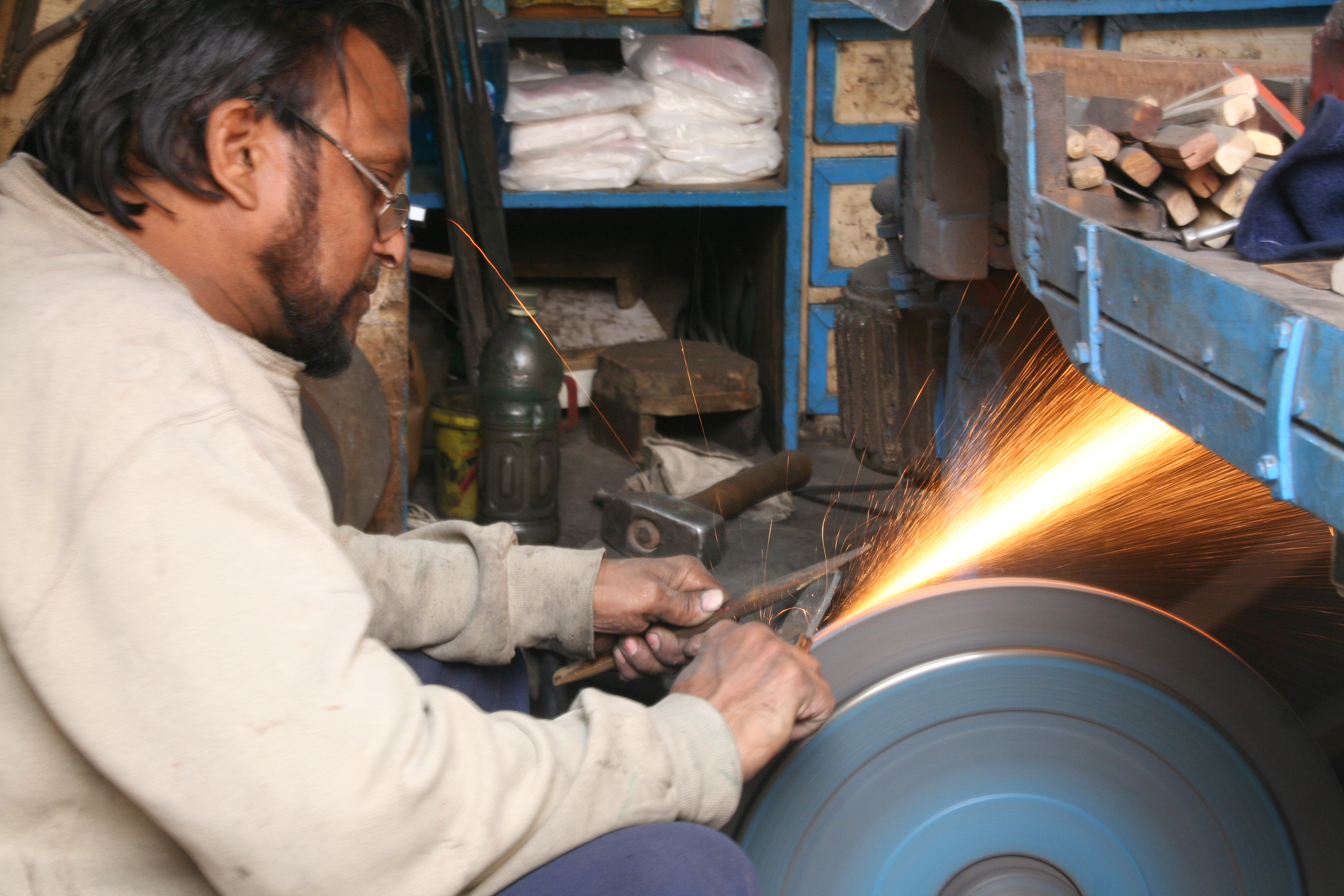
Knife sharpening shop in Delhi

== Grinding ==
Grinding is generally done with some type of sharpening stone. Sharpening stones come in coarse and fine grits and can be described as hard or soft based on whether the grit comes free of the stone with use. Many sources of naturally occurring stones exist around the world; some types known to the ancient world are no longer used, due to exhaustion of former resources or the ready availability of superior alternatives. Arkansas, USA is one source for honing stones, which are traditionally used with water or honing oil. India is another traditional source for stones. Ceramic hones are also common, especially for fine grit size. Japanese water stones (both artificial and natural) come in very fine grits. Before use, they are soaked in water, then flushed with water occasionally to reduce energy loss to friction, and to keep material from clogging the stone's pores. The mixture of water and abraded stone and knife material is known as slurry, which can assist with the polishing of the knife edge and help sharpen the blade. Generally, these are more costly than oilstones. Coated hones, which have an abrasive, sometimes diamonds, on a base of plastic or metal, are also available.

Diamond stones can be useful in the sharpening process. Diamond is the hardest naturally occurring substance known and as such can be used to sharpen almost any material. (Coarse diamond sharpening stones can be used for flattening waterstones.) Alternatively, tungsten carbide blades can be used in knife sharpening.

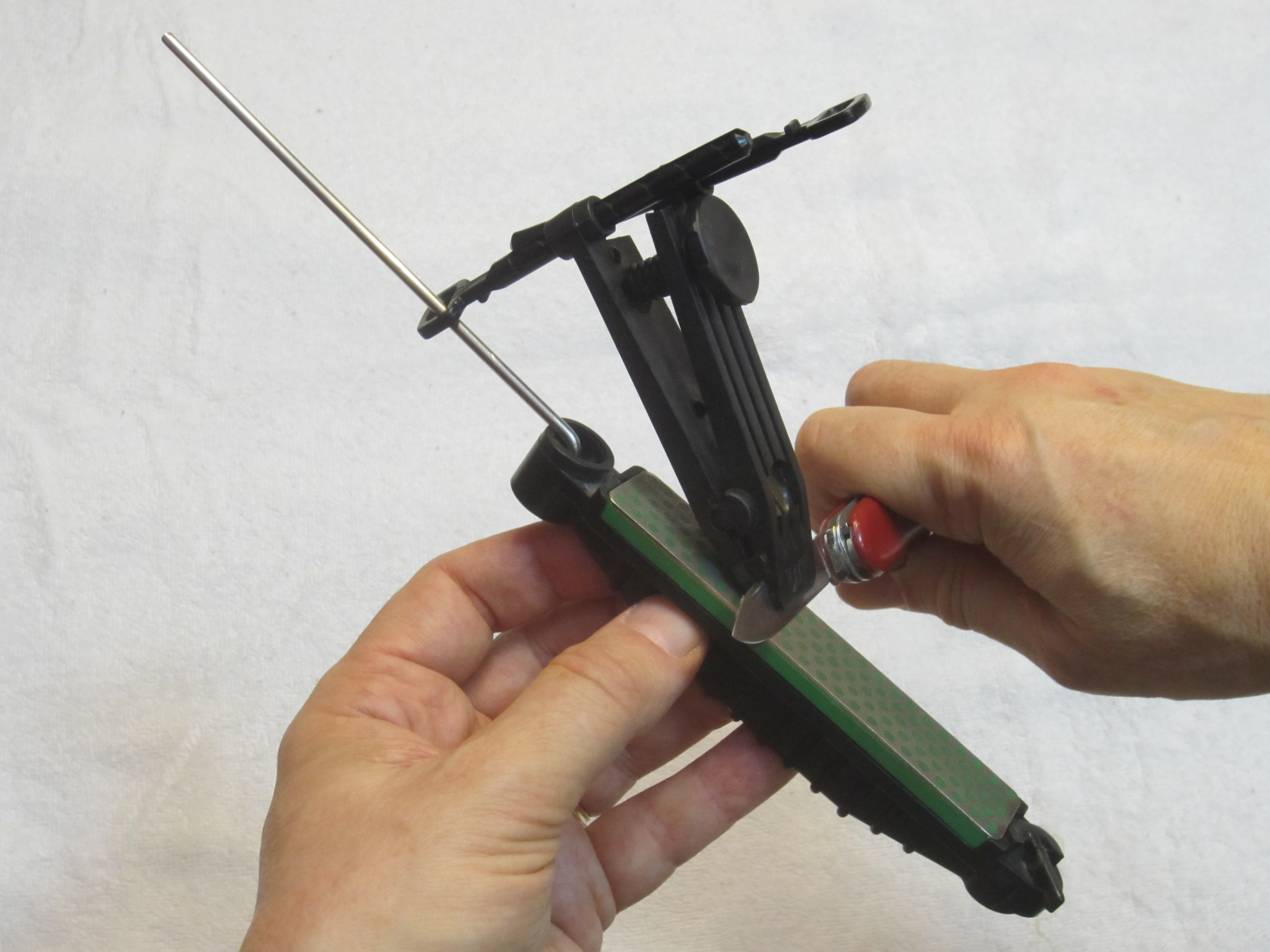
A clamp-on knife sharpener. The rod guides the sharpening stone to maintain a consistent angle. The angle can be adjusted by moving the guide posts up or down. This sharpener uses a diamond dust coated stone to remove metal from the knife blade.

- Clamp-style sharpening tools use a clamp with several holes with predefined angles. The stone is mounted on a rod and is pulled through these holes, so that the angle remains consistent.
- Another system is the crock stick setup, where two sticks are put into a plastic or wooden base to form a V shape. When the knife is pulled up the V, the angle is held so long as the blade is held perpendicular to the base.
- Several cutlery manufacturers now offer electric knife sharpeners with multiple stages with at least one grinding stage. These electric sharpeners are typically used in the kitchen but have the ability to sharpen blades such as pocket or tactical knives. The main benefit of using an electric sharpener is speed with many models that can complete the sharpening process in one to two minutes. The disadvantage is that the sharpening angle is fixed so some specialized knives, like a Japanese style Santoku, may need additional attention to sharpen to the ideal angle.
- Some manual sharpening tools guide the blade against the stone at a predetermined angle. One such system is known as the HORL principle, which combines a cylindrical sharpener with a magnetic angle support, allowing the knife blade to be held at an angle of 15° or 20° while being sharpened with a diamond grinding disc and then deburred with a ceramic honing disc.
Victorinox pull-through knife sharpener

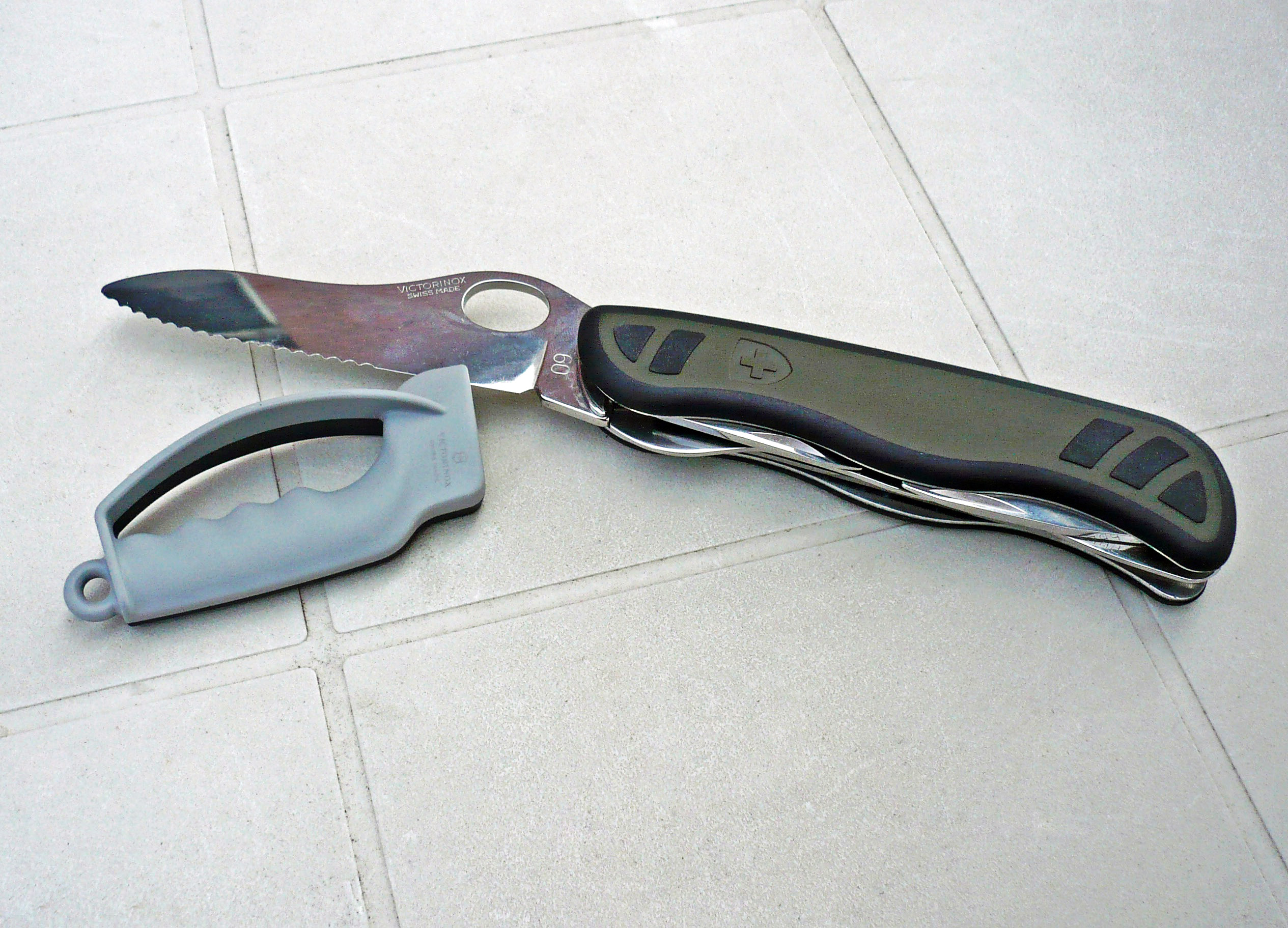
For sharpening of plain and serrated edges on (Swiss Army) knives and multi-tools between two V-shaped inserts, similar to miniaturized crock sticks

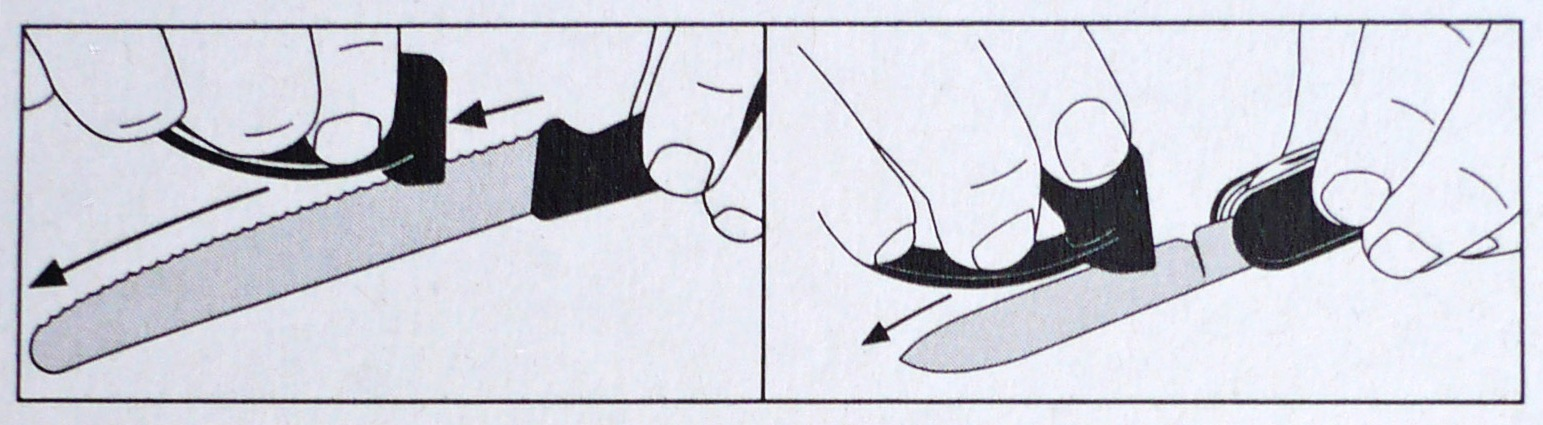
Instruction for using the sharpener. Pull 2 to 4 times over the cutting edge with pressure, then 4 to 6 times over the cutting edge with light pressure to smooth the edge.

== Steeling ==
Steeling helps maintain sharpness. This process realigns the edge, correcting for dulling causes such as a rolled edge. A sharpening steel is a type of hardened cylindrical rod used similarly to honing stones. For example, a butcher steel is a round file with the teeth running the long way, while a packer steel (used in the meat packer's industry) is a smooth, polished steel rod designed for straightening the turned edge of a knife, and is also useful for burnishing a newly finished edge. Because steels have a small diameter they exert high local pressure, and therefore affect the knife metal when used with very little force. They are intended for mild steel knives that are steeled several times a day, but are not well suited for today's tougher and harder blade steels. Steels harder than 60 HRC can be prone to chipping when steeled, so stropping may be a more suitable option for maintain the integrity of the apex. Diamond steels are now available that have an industrial diamond coating and can remove blade metal as well as straighten, therefore used correctly they can re-profile a knife instead of just honing.

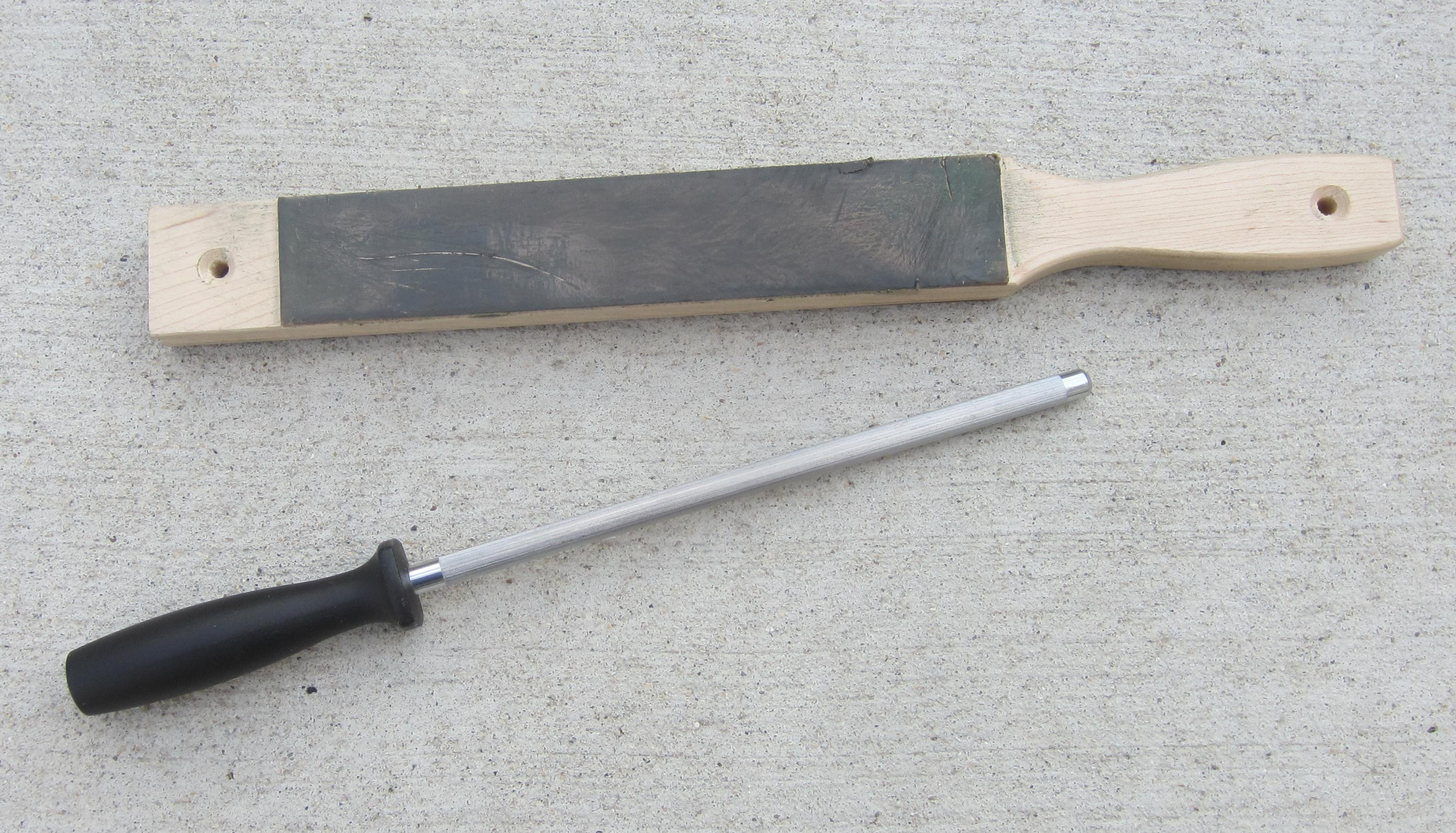
A leather strop on a wooden handle, top. The leather is coated with green chromium oxide polishing compound. Bottom, one pattern of butcher's steel for knife edge maintenance.

== Stropping ==
Stropping a knife is a finishing step. This is often done with a leather strap, either clean or impregnated with abrasive compounds (e.g. chromium(III) oxide or diamond), but can be done on paper, cardstock, cloth, or even bare skin in a pinch. It removes little or no metal material, but produces a very sharp edge by either straightening or very slightly reshaping the edge. Stropping may bring a somewhat sharp blade to "like new" condition.

== Thinning ==
Left side shows the approximate angle for sharpening. Right side shows the approximate angle for thinning.

Thinning does what the name suggests – it makes the knife thinner than what it was. This is to allow the newer geometry of the knife to pass through material easily. Commonly done for kitchen knives, this practice does not sharpen, but the same principle is there. This is important, since repeated sharpening will end up thickening the primary bevel and it will be harder for the knife to pass through material. Harder steels can go thinner by going at a lower angle (about 3-5 degrees), while thicker steels can be thinned about 2-3 degrees less from the usual sharpening angle. This is a small change but makes a drastic difference.

== See also ==
- Blade sharpener
