= Sharpening =

Creating or refining the edge of a cutting tool

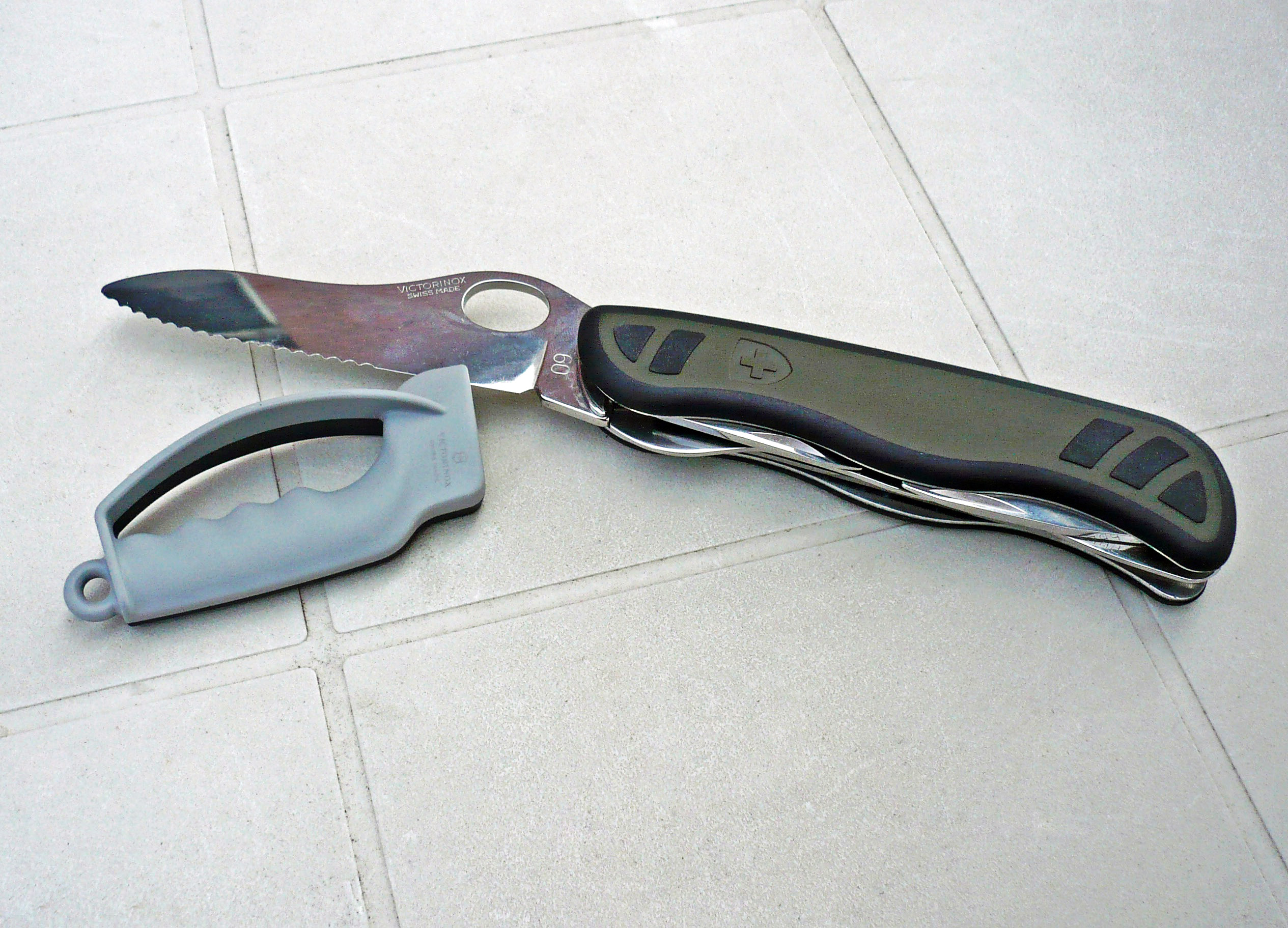
A hand-held tungsten carbide knife sharpener, with a finger guard, can be used for sharpening plain and serrated edges on pocket knives and multi-tools.

Sharpening is the process of creating or refining a sharp edge of appropriate shape on a tool or implement designed for cutting. Sharpening is done by removing material from the implement with an abrasive substance harder than the material of the implement, followed sometimes by processes to polish the sharp surface to increase smoothness and correct small mechanical deformations without removing significant metal. The process creates a bevel - the angled surface that meets at the cutting edge. Ideally, the two sides of the edge meet at a precise mathematical point (the apex), though in practice, a microscopic radius always remains. Sharpening is distinct from honing or steeling, which are maintenance steps used to realign an edge that has rolled over during use, though the terms are often used interchangeably in casual conversation.

Video: Saw blade sharpening machine

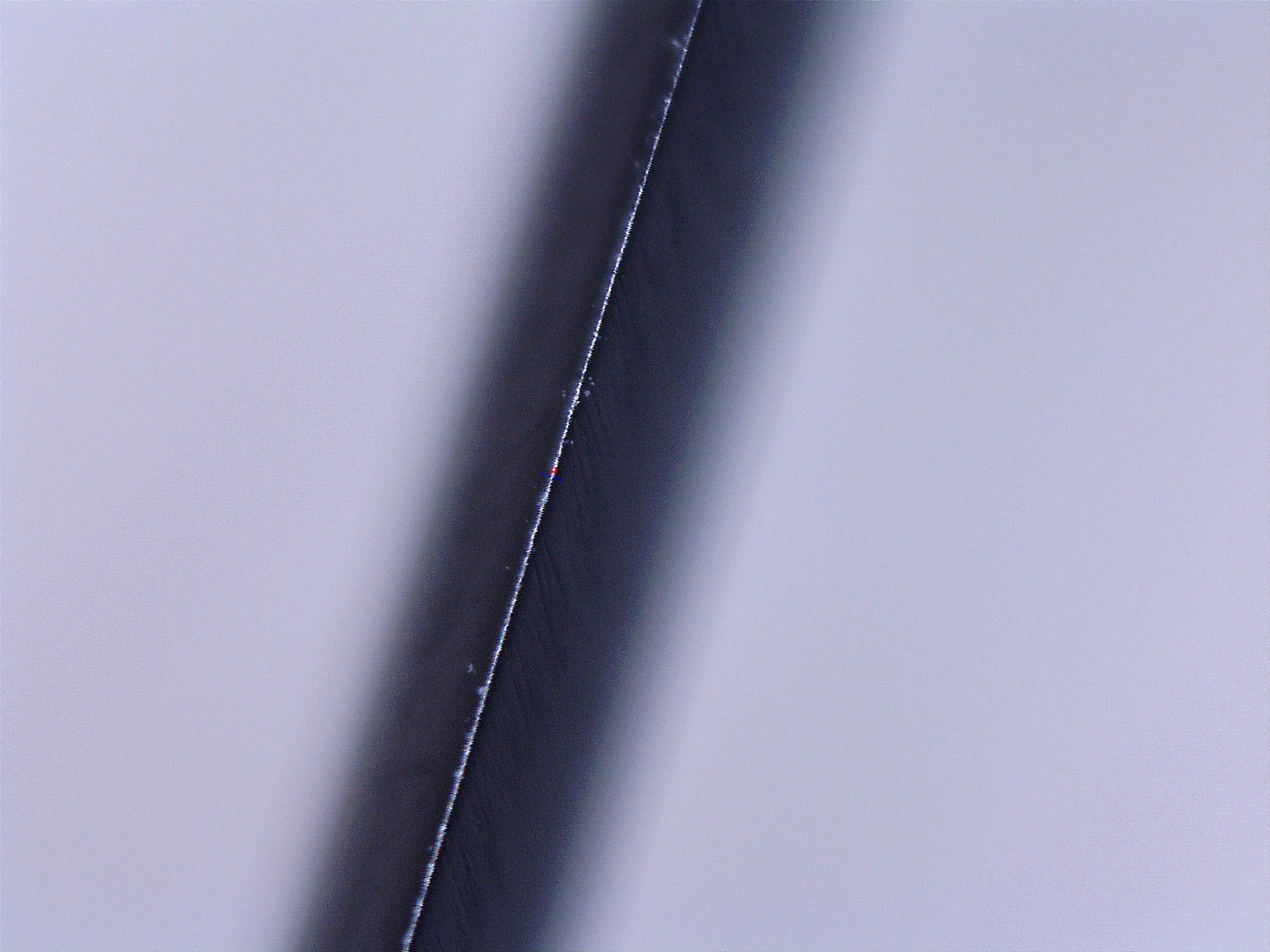
Edge/Apex of a knife after sharpening and stropping. Although this edge is sharp enough to bite a thumbnail, cut paper smoothly, or shave arm hair, the microscope plainly shows an edge which reflects light back into the lens. A truly sharp edge is too thin to reflect significant light.

== Tools and materials ==
Sharpening generally involves the use of an abrasive material that is harder than the tool steel being sharpened. The hardness of sharpening materials is often measured on the Mohs scale. Tools can be categorized by their method of operation: abrasive stones, mechanical grinders, and honing devices.

=== Abrasive stones ===
Also known as whetstones, these are blocks of abrasive material used for manual sharpening. They require a lubricant—typically oil or water—to reduce friction and flush away swarf (metal filings) to prevent the stone's pores from clogging.

- Natural stones: Mined from geological formations, such as Novaculite (Arkansas stones) or Japanese sedimentary stones. These are prized for their unique feel and finish but can be inconsistent in grit.
- Synthetic stones: Manufactured from Aluminium oxide or Silicon carbide. These are available in precise grit ratings, ranging from coarse (for repairing chips) to extremely fine (for polishing).
- Diamond plates: Steel plates coated with monocrystalline diamonds. These remain flat and cut very fast due to diamond's extreme hardness, making them suitable for modern "super-steels" with high vanadium carbide content.

=== Honing and stropping tools ===
While sharpening removes metal to create a new edge, honing tools are often used to maintain an existing edge.

- Honing steels: A metal or ceramic rod used to realign the microscopic teeth of a blade that have rolled over during use. Smooth metal steels strictly realign (burnish) the edge, while ceramic or diamond-coated steels act as fine abrasives that remove a small amount of metal.
- Strops: A strip of leather or canvas, often charged with an abrasive polishing compound (such as Chromium(III) oxide). Stropping is the final step in many sharpening processes, used to remove the "burr" (a thin wire of waste metal) left by the sharpening stone.

=== Mechanical sharpeners ===
- Electric knife sharpeners: Consumer appliances that pull the blade through motorized abrasive wheels or disks. While fast and convenient, they offer less control over the edge angle and remove material more aggressively than manual methods.
- Grinding wheels: High-speed bench grinders are used for rapid material removal, such as repairing a damaged axe or mower blade. However, the friction heat generated can ruin the temper of the steel if not cooled carefully, softening the edge permanently.
- Wet grinders: Slow-rotating grinding wheels that pass through a water bath. These are commonly used for woodworking tools (chisels, plane irons) because the water cooling prevents the steel from overheating.

== Angles ==
The angle of the cutting edge determines the balance between sharpness (cutting ability) and durability (resistance to chipping or rolling). This angle is typically measured as the "included angle" (the total angle of the wedge) or "degrees per side" (dps). A lower angle creates a thinner, sharper edge that cuts with less resistance but is more fragile; a higher angle creates a thicker, more durable edge that is less prone to damage but requires more force to cut.

=== Common angle ranges ===
Different tools require specific geometries based on their intended material targets:

- Under 15° per side: Reserved for tools requiring extreme sharpness for cutting soft materials, such as Straight razors, scalpels, and specialized sushi knives (e.g., yanagiba). These edges are highly susceptible to damage if they contact hard surfaces or bone.
- 15°–20° per side: The standard range for most kitchen cutlery (chef's knives, santoku, paring knives). This angle provides a balance suitable for slicing vegetables and boneless meats. Western kitchen knives are historically sharpened closer to 20°, while Japanese knives often utilize harder steels capable of holding a 15° edge.
- 20°–25° per side: Typical for general-purpose outdoor knives, such as pocket knives and hunting knives. This geometry is robust enough to handle wood carving and light chopping without immediate edge failure.
- 30°+ per side: Used for impact tools like axes, machetes, and chisels. The obtuse angle supports the steel behind the edge, preventing catastrophic chipping when striking hard wood or bone.

=== Compound bevels ===
Some tools utilize a "double bevel" or "micro-bevel" geometry. In this configuration, the primary grind of the blade is relatively acute (e.g., 15°) to reduce drag, while the actual cutting edge is honed to a steeper angle (e.g., 20°). This creates a durable edge apex while maintaining the slicing performance of a thinner blade.

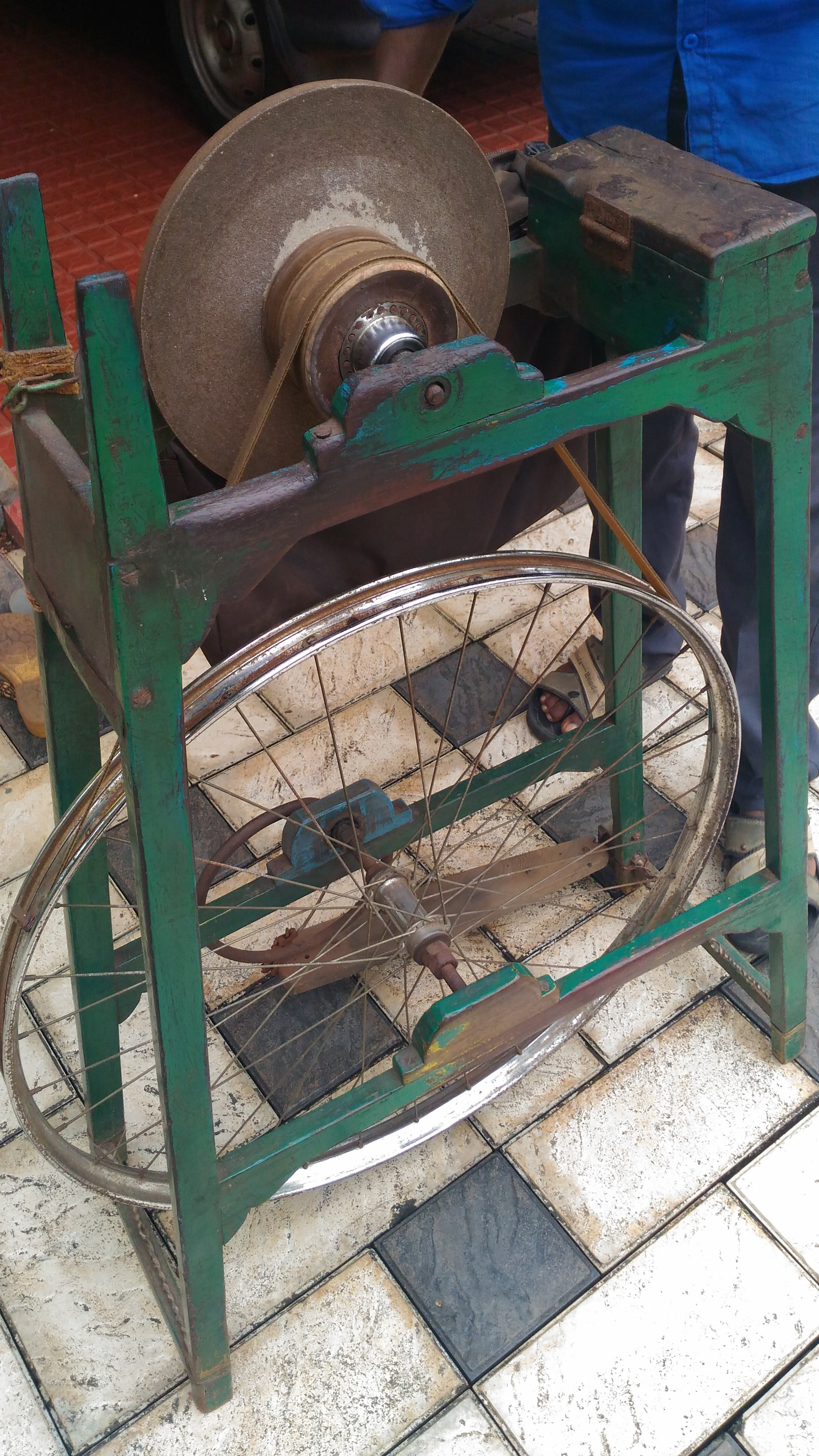
Sharpening tools

== Straight edges ==
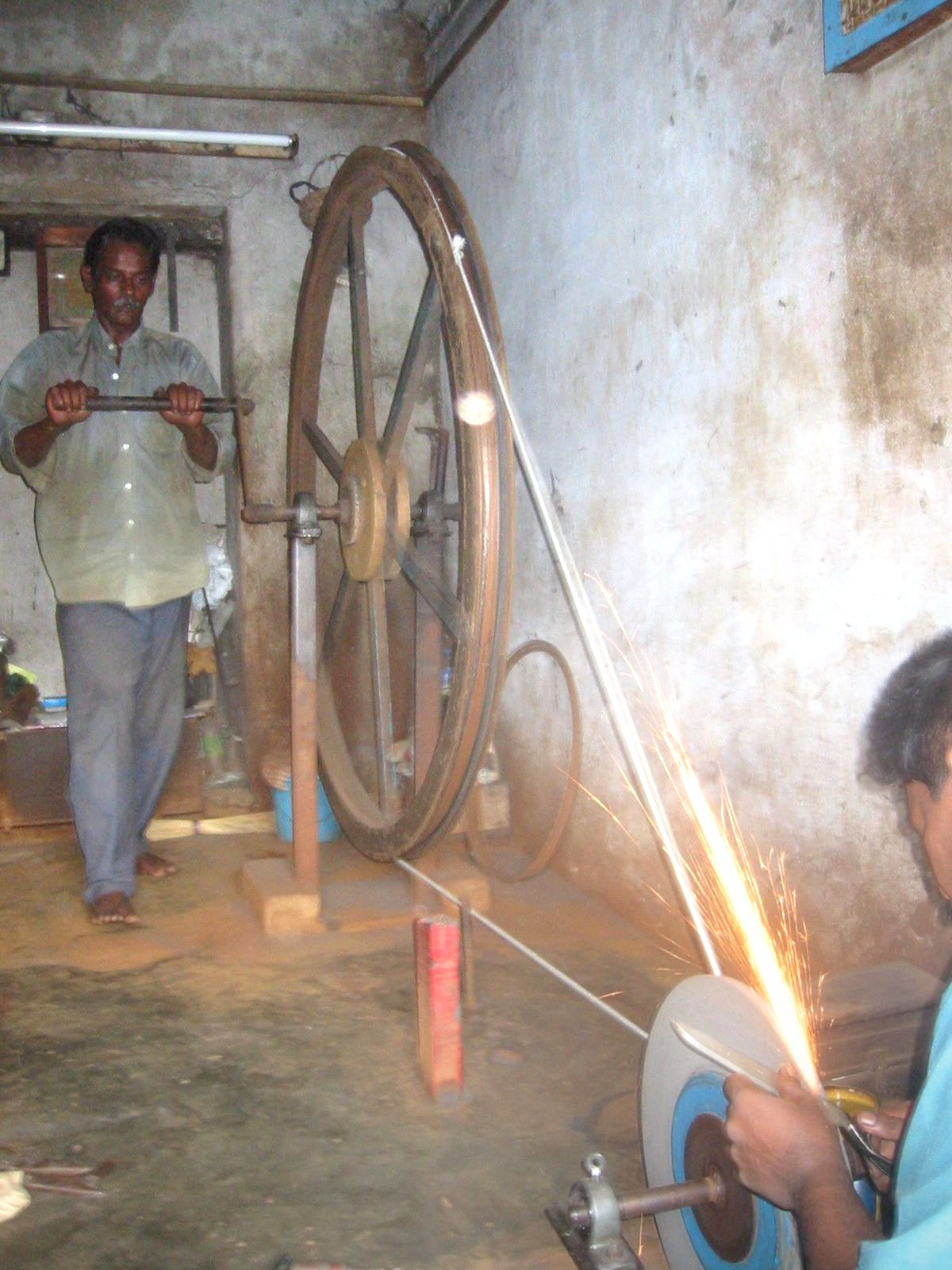
A two-man team sharpen a pair of scissors at high speed

Many implements have a cutting edge which is essentially straight. Knives, chisels, straight-edge razors, and scissors are examples. Sharpening a straight edge is relatively simple, and can be done by using either a simple sharpening device which is very easy to use but will not produce the best possible results, or by the skillful use of oil or water grinding stones, grinding wheels, hones, etc.

Sharpening these implements can be expressed as the creation of two intersecting planes which produce an edge that is sharp enough to cut through the target material. For example, the blade of a steel knife is ground to a bevel so that the two sides of the blade meet. This edge is then refined by honing until the blade is capable of cutting.

The extent to which this honing takes place depends upon the intended use of the tool or implement. For some applications an edge with a certain amount of jaggedness is acceptable, or even desirable, as this creates a serrated cutting edge. In other applications the edge must be as smooth as possible.

=== Steeling ===
Sharpening straight edges (knives, chisels, etc.) by hand can be divided into phases. First the edge is sharpened with an abrasive sharpening stone, or a succession of increasingly fine stones, which shape the blade by removing material; the finer the abrasive the finer the finish. Then the edge may be stropped by polishing the edge with a fine abrasive such as rouge or tripoli on a piece of stout leather or canvas. The edge may be steeled or honed by passing the blade against a hard metal or ceramic "steel" which plastically deforms and straightens the material of the blade's edge which may have been rolled over irregularly in use, but not enough to need complete resharpening.

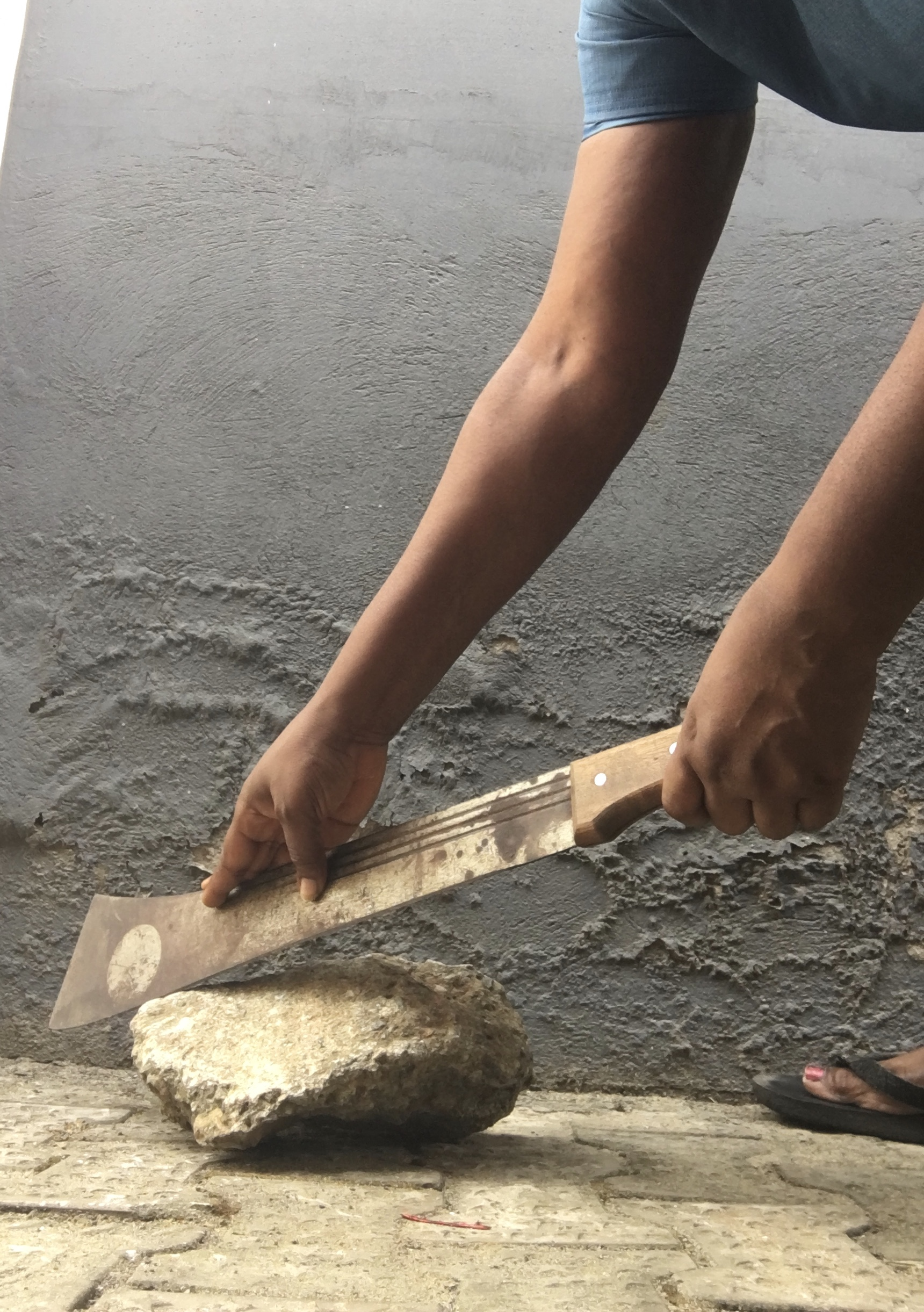
Sharpening of cutlass

== Other edges ==
Different techniques are required where the edges are not straight. Special tools and skills are more often required, and sharpening is often best done by a specialist rather than the user of the tool.

Examples include:

- Drill bits - twist drills used for wood or steel are usually sharpened on a grinding wheel or within a purpose made grinding jig to an angle of 60° from vertical (120° total) although sharper angles may be used for hard or brittle materials such as glass.
- Saws have teeth, typically splayed from the blade so that the cutting edge removes enough material to allow the whole blade to pass freely through the cleft material. Usually only the leading edge of the saw blade is sharpened.

== As an occupation or service ==
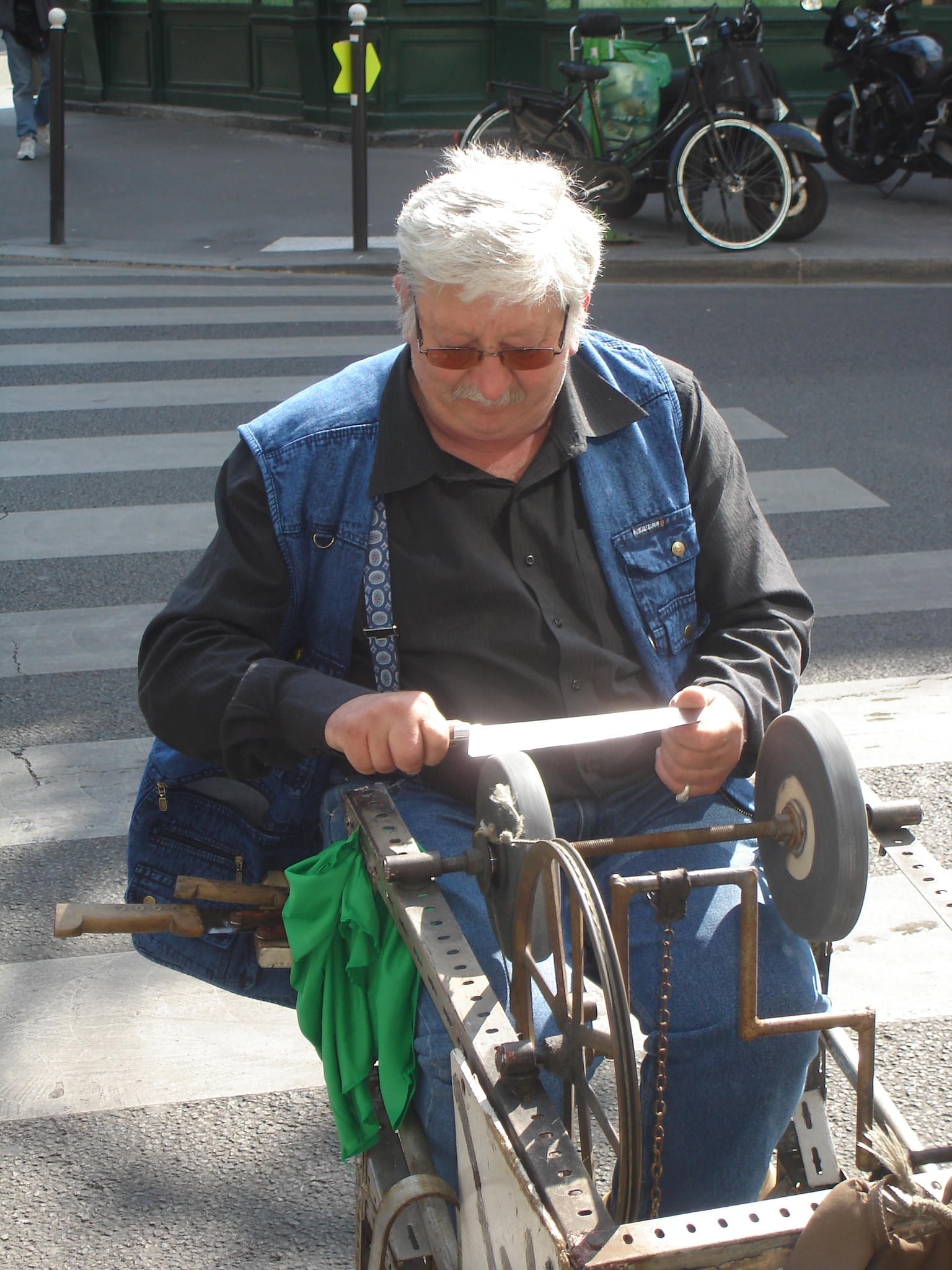
A roadside knife grinder on rue Faidherbe (11e arrondissement) in Paris. He is one of the few knife grinders who still practise in France.

Sharpening tools

A number of blade sharpeners operate a mobile business, traveling to their customers locations, often in highly equipped vehicles.

Less common in developed nations, but still very common in many areas of the world, skilled craftsmen provide a roadside sharpening service for kitchen knives and cleavers, scissors, and sometimes other blades.

They commonly have a 'round' which may include trades such as butchers or barbers some of whom, in addition to using the service for their own tools may act as 'agents' collecting instruments for the general public.

Sharpeners may also have regular 'stops' in busy streets or residential areas, calling out to people from their homes or businesses using musical instruments such as handbells or pipes.

The sharpener usually has some sort of mobile work bench with a grinding wheel which may be powered by hand, using a bicycle mechanism or electric motor.

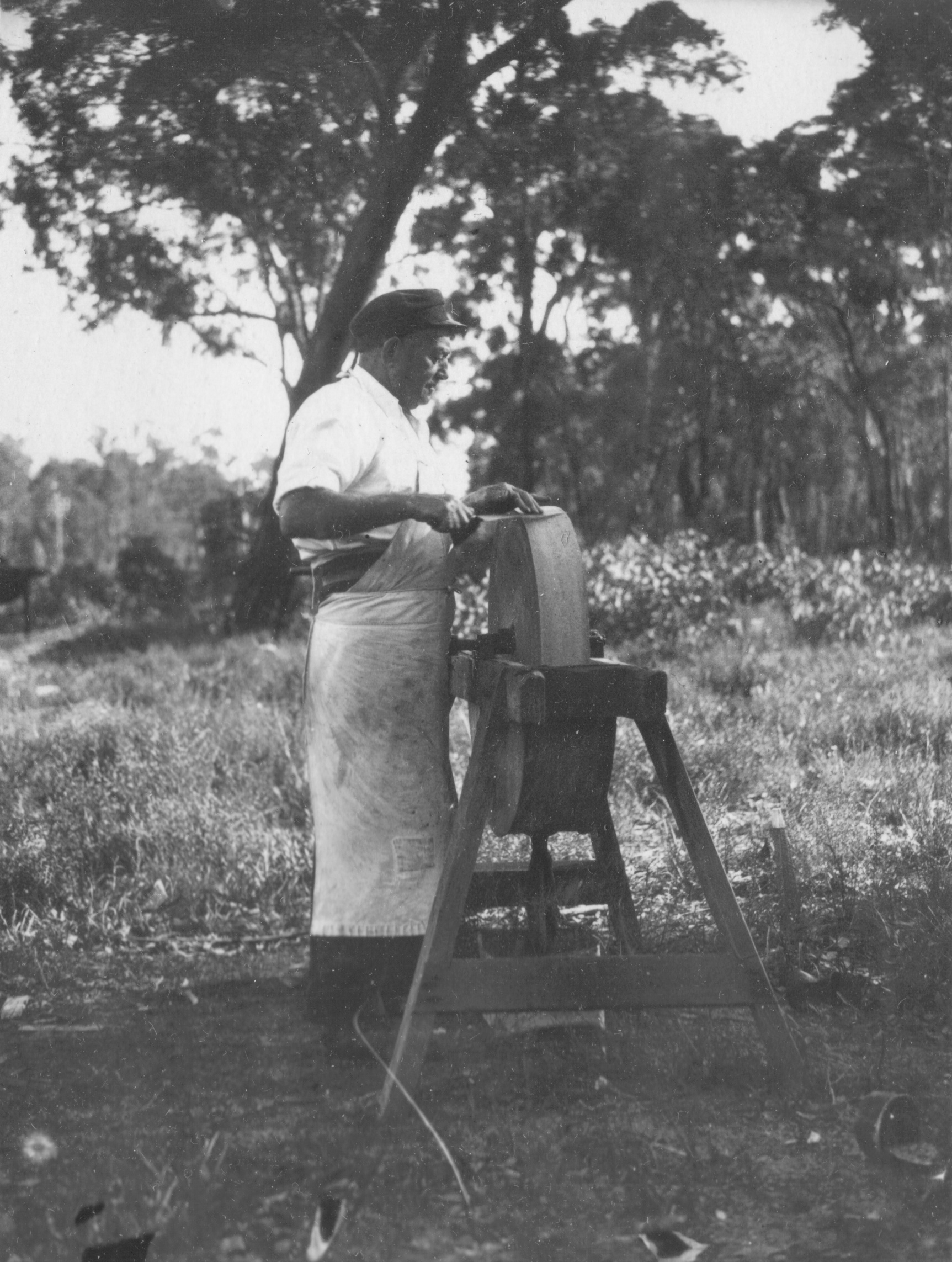
A cook for railroad workers sharpens a knife on a stone wheel, in the fields of Western Australia, 1927

As well as coarse grinding, sharpeners also typically 'dress' the cutting edges with a sharpening stone or honing steel, secure or replace loose handles and generally offer advice and assistance regarding best practice. Some also sell knives and related products.

Modern mobile sharpening services will travel in a van or bus and have a workshop inside that allows them to service the edges of various tools and instruments. There are two major forms of sharpening or sharpeners, where either one sharpens as a hobbyist and "makes it work" or works as a craftsman that strives to learn different styles of sharpening and how they perform under different applications.

== See also ==
- Blade
- Grinding machine
- Knife sharpening
- Razor strop
- Saw set
- Sharpening jig
- Sharpening stone
- Sharpness (cutting)
