= Honing steel =

Rod of steel used to restore keenness to dulled blades

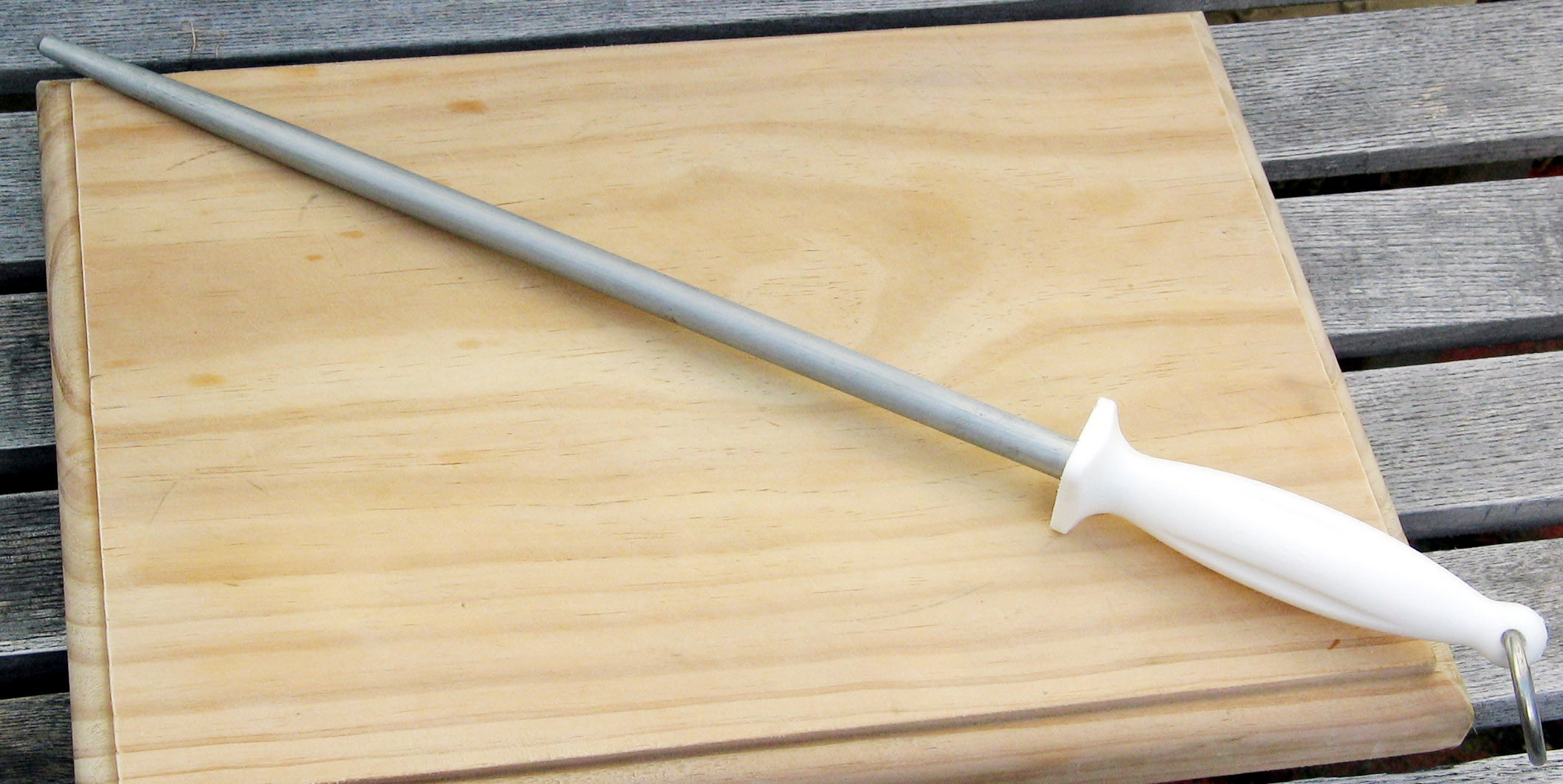
A honing steel on a cutting board

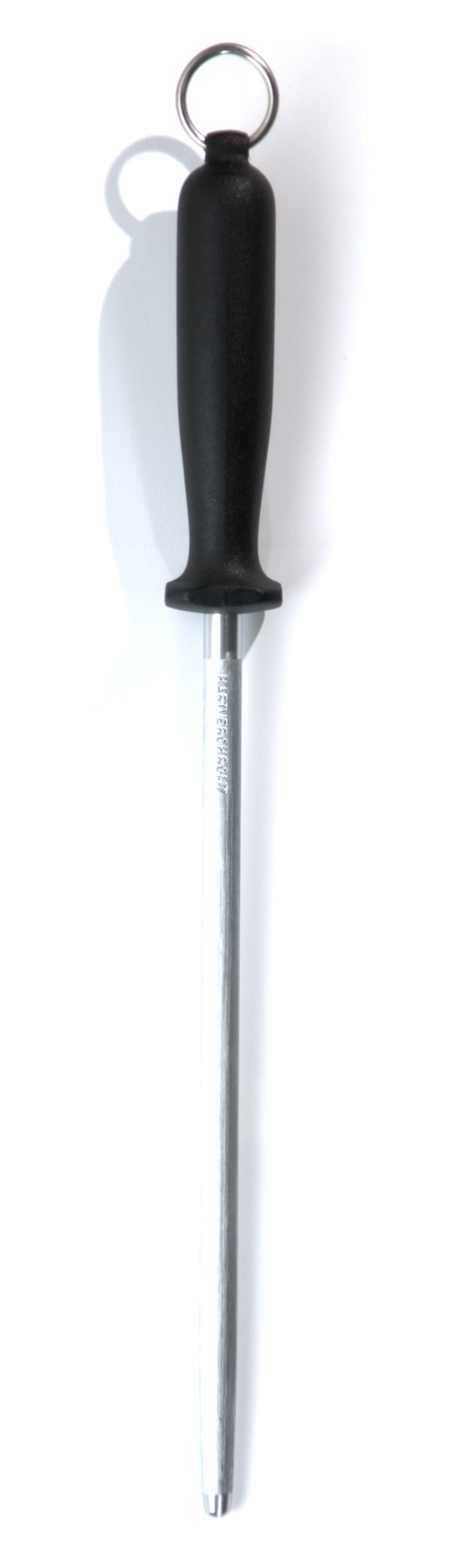
Common steel for use in households

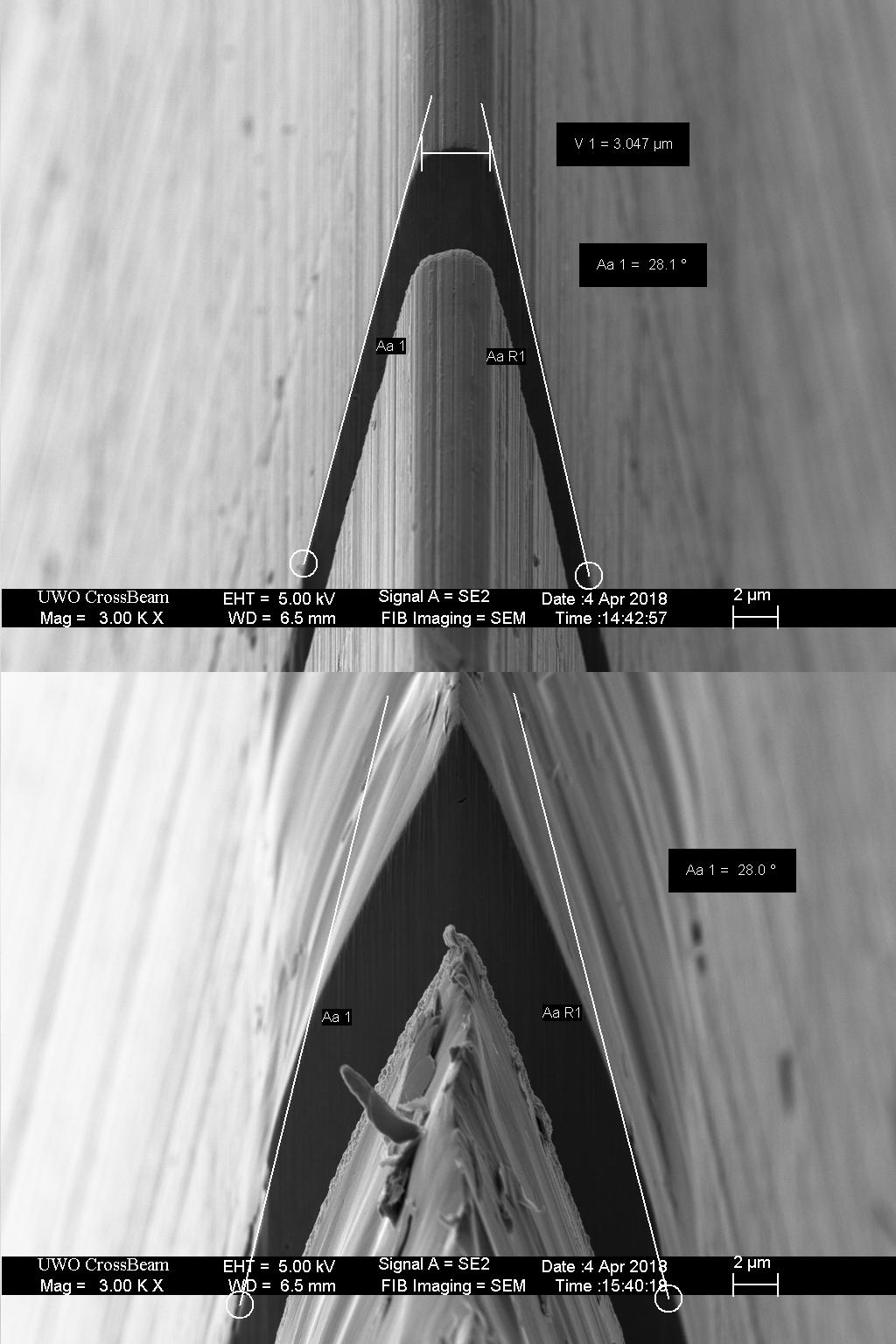
SEM images of the cross-section of a blade before (dull) and after (sharp) honing with a smooth rod

A honing steel, sometimes referred to as a sharpening steel, whet steel, sharpening stick, sharpening rod, butcher's steel, and chef's steel, is a rod of steel, ceramic or diamond-coated steel used to restore keenness (the microscopic shape of the cutting edge) and therefore its useful sharpness to blade edges. They are flat, oval, or round in cross-section and up to 30 centimetres (1 ft) long. The steel and ceramic honing steels may have longitudinal ridges, whereas the diamond-coated steels are smooth but embedded with abrasive diamond particles.

Non-abrasive honing rods such as smooth ceramic or ribbed steel are able to remove small amounts of metal via adhesive wear. In normal use, the rod is applied to the blade at a slightly higher angle than that of the bevel, resulting in the formation of a micro-bevel, restoring the cutting edge fine shape (keenness) and therefore its ability to cut cleanly.

The term "hone" is associated with light maintenance performed on a blade without the effort and precision normally associated with sharpening, so the name "hone" was borrowed. Despite this, they are commonly misunderstood to be sharpening blades. In the 1980s, ceramic abrasives became increasingly popular and proved an equal, if not superior, method for accomplishing the same daily maintenance tasks; manufacturers replaced steels with ceramic (and later, manufactured diamond abrasive) sharpening "steels" that were actually hones.

== Use ==
Honing steels are used by lightly placing the near edge of the blade against the base of the steel, then sliding the blade away from oneself along the steel while moving it down – the blade moves diagonally, while the steel remains stationary. This should be done with the blade held at an angle to the steel, usually about 20°, and repeating on the opposite side at the same angle. This is repeated five to ten times per side.

=== Steeling ===
It is often recommended that steeling be performed immediately before or after using a knife and can be done daily. By contrast, knives are generally sharpened much less frequently. A traditional smooth honing steel is of no use if the edge is blunt, because it removes no material; instead it fixes deformations along the edge of a sharp blade, technically known as burnishing. There has long been speculation about the efficacy of steeling (re-aligning the edge) vs honing (removing minor deformation with abrasives); studies tend to favor abrasives for daily maintenance, especially in high-carbide-volume "stainless" steels (such as the popular CPM S30V steel, which tends to "tear out" when steeled rather than re-forming an edge.)

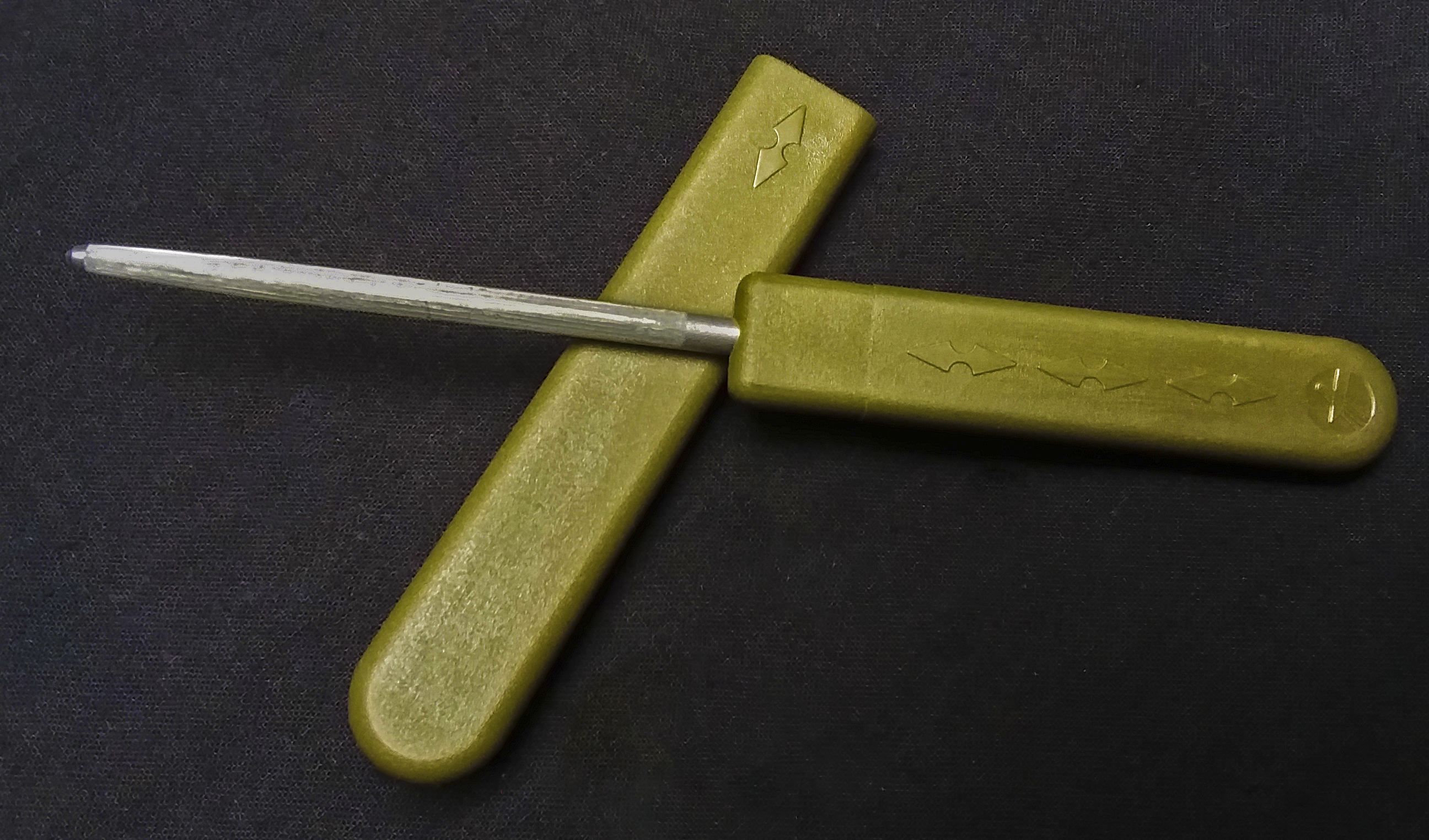
Small honing steel for outdoor activities

== Usage trends ==
Steels have traditionally been used in the West, especially in heavy-use scenarios (e.g. butchering, where the edge deforms due to forceful contact with bone). These scenarios also lead Western trends toward blades tempered to a lower level of hardness (and thus lower brittleness). In East Asia, notably Japan, harder knives are preferred, so there is little need for steeling intra-day, as the edge does not deform as much. Instead, the blade is honed as needed on a waterstone. While tradition has kept the practice of steeling alive in Western kitchens, the majority of honing steels sold are abrasive rather than smooth, and knives are harder and more frequently made of stainless steel, which does not respond to traditional steeling techniques as well as high-carbon/low alloy tool steels.

== See also ==
- Knife sharpening
- Razor strop
