= Abrasive =

Rough material used to shape or finish objects by friction

An abrasive is a material, often a mineral, that is used to shape or finish a workpiece through rubbing which leads to part of the workpiece being worn away by friction. While finishing a material often means polishing it to gain a smooth, reflective surface, the process can also involve roughening as in satin, matte or beaded finishes. In short, the ceramics which are used to cut, grind and polish other softer materials are known as abrasives.

Abrasives are extremely commonplace and are used very extensively in a wide variety of industrial, domestic, and technological applications. This gives rise to a large variation in the physical and chemical composition of abrasives as well as the shape of the abrasive. Some common uses for abrasives include grinding, polishing, buffing, honing, cutting, drilling, sharpening, lapping, and sanding (see abrasive machining). (For simplicity, "mineral" in this article will be used loosely to refer to both minerals and mineral-like substances whether man-made or not.)

Files are not abrasives; they remove material not by scratching or rubbing, but by the cutting action of sharp teeth which have been cut into the surface of the file, very much like those of a saw. However, diamond files are a form of coated abrasive (as they are metal rods coated with diamond powder).

== Mechanics of abrasion ==
Abrasives generally rely upon a difference in hardness between the abrasive and the material being worked upon, the abrasive being the harder of the two substances. However, it is not strictly necessary, as any two solid materials that repeatedly rub against each other will tend to wear each other away; examples include, softer shoe soles wearing away wooden or stone steps over decades or centuries or glaciers abrading stone valleys.

Typically, materials used as abrasives are either hard minerals (rated at 7 or above on Mohs scale of mineral hardness) or are synthetic stones, some of which may be chemically and physically identical to naturally occurring minerals but which cannot be called minerals as they did not arise naturally. (While useful for comparative purposes, the Mohs scale is of limited value to materials engineers as it is an arbitrary, ordinal, irregular scale.) Diamond, a common abrasive, for instance occurs both naturally and is industrially produced, as is corundum which occurs naturally but which is nowadays more commonly manufactured from bauxite. However, even softer minerals like calcium carbonate are used as abrasives, such as "polishing agents" in toothpaste.

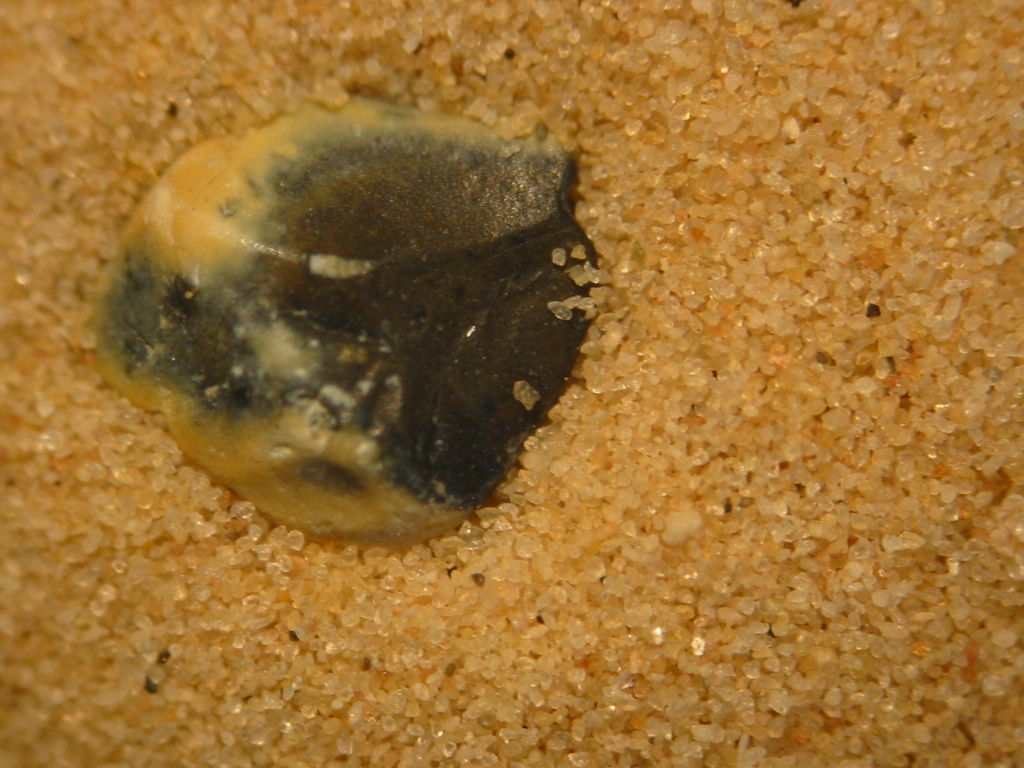
Grit size ranging from 2 mm (the large grain) (about F 10 using FEPA standards) to about 40 micrometres (about F 240 or P 360).

These minerals are either crushed or are already of a sufficiently small size (anywhere from macroscopic grains as large as about 2 mm to microscopic grains about 0.001 mm in diameter) to permit their use as an abrasive. These grains, commonly called grit, have rough edges, often terminating in points which will decrease the surface area in contact and increase the localised contact pressure. The abrasive and the material to be worked are brought into contact while in relative motion to each other. Force applied through the grains causes fragments of the worked material to break away, while simultaneously smoothing the abrasive grain and/or causing the grain to work loose from the rest of the abrasive.

Some factors which will affect how quickly a substance is abraded include:

- Difference in hardness between the two substances: a much harder abrasive will cut faster and deeper
- Grain size (grit size): larger grains will cut faster as they also cut deeper
- Adhesion between grains, between grains and backing, between grains and matrix: determines how quickly grains are lost from the abrasive and how soon fresh grains, if present, are exposed
- Contact force: more force will cause faster abrasion
- Loading: worn abrasive and cast off work material tends to fill spaces between abrasive grains so reducing cutting efficiency while increasing friction
- Use of lubricant/coolant/metalworking fluid: Can carry away swarf (preventing loading), transport heat (which may affect the physical properties of the workpiece or the abrasive), decrease friction (with the substrate or matrix), suspend worn work material and abrasives allowing for a finer finish, conduct stress to the workpiece.

== Abrasive minerals ==
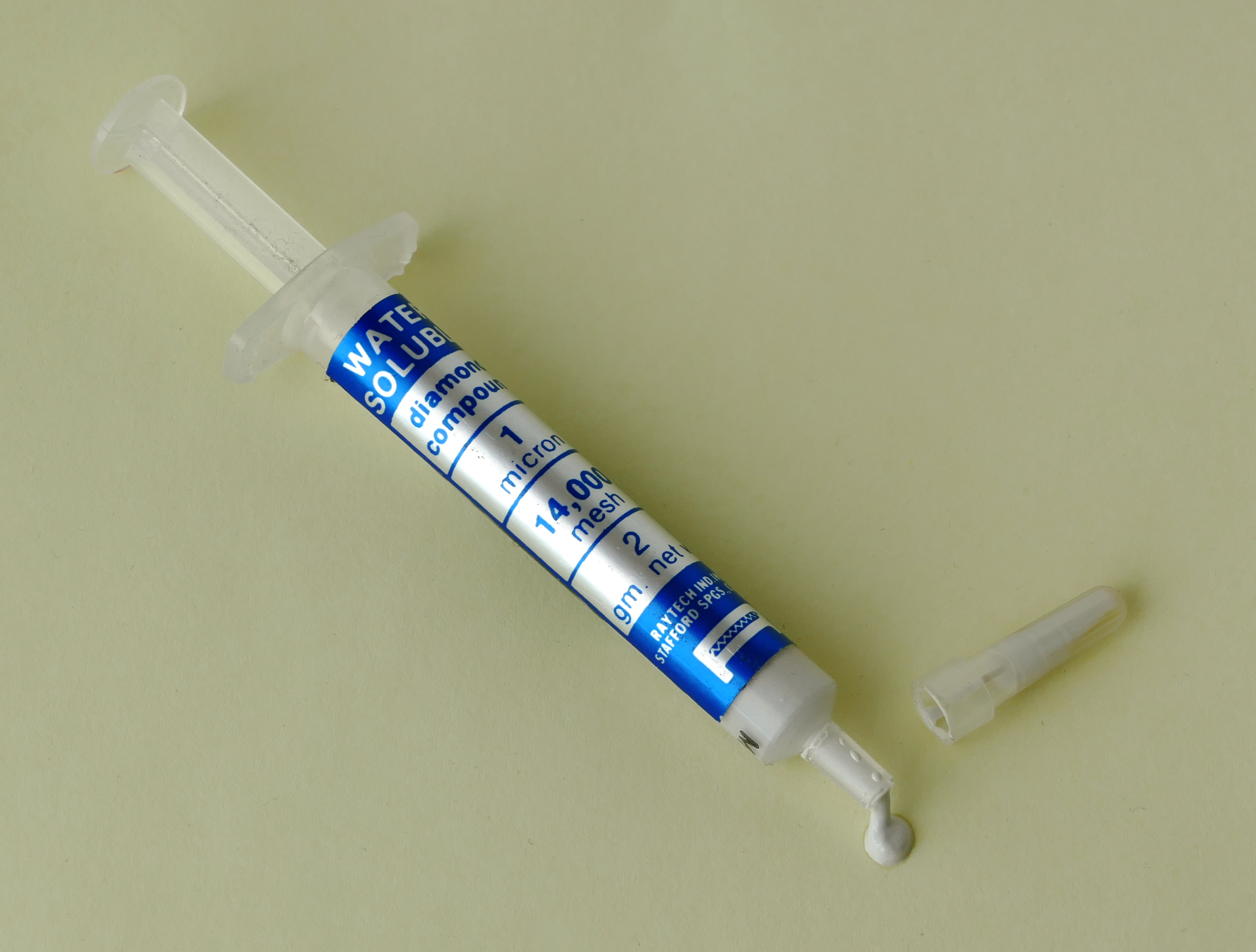
Diamond powder paste

Abrasives may be classified as either natural or synthetic. When discussing sharpening stones, natural stones have long been considered superior but advances in material technology are seeing this distinction become less distinct. Many synthetic abrasives are effectively identical to a natural mineral, differing only in that the synthetic mineral has been manufactured rather than mined. Impurities in the natural mineral may make it less effective.

Some naturally occurring abrasives are:

- Calcite (calcium carbonate)
- Emery (impure corundum)
- Diamond dust (synthetic diamonds are used extensively)
- Novaculite
- Pumice
- Iron(III) oxide
- Sand
- Corundum
- Garnet
- Sandstone
- Rotten stone (Tripoli)
- Powdered feldspar
- Staurolite

Some abrasive minerals (such as zirconia alumina) occur naturally but are sufficiently rare or sufficiently more difficult or costly to obtain such that a synthetic stone is used industrially. These and other artificial abrasives include:

- Borazon (cubic boron nitride or CBN)
- Ceramic
- Ceramic aluminium oxide
- Ceramic iron oxide
- Corundum (alumina or aluminium oxide)
- Dry ice
- Glass powder
- Steel abrasive
- Silicon carbide (carborundum)
- Zirconia alumina
- Boron carbide
- Slags

== Manufactured abrasives ==
Abrasives are shaped for various purposes. Natural abrasives are often sold as dressed stones, usually in the form of a rectangular block. Both natural and synthetic abrasives are commonly available in a wide variety of shapes, often coming as bonded or coated abrasives, including blocks, belts, discs, wheels, sheets, rods and loose grains.

=== Bonded abrasives ===
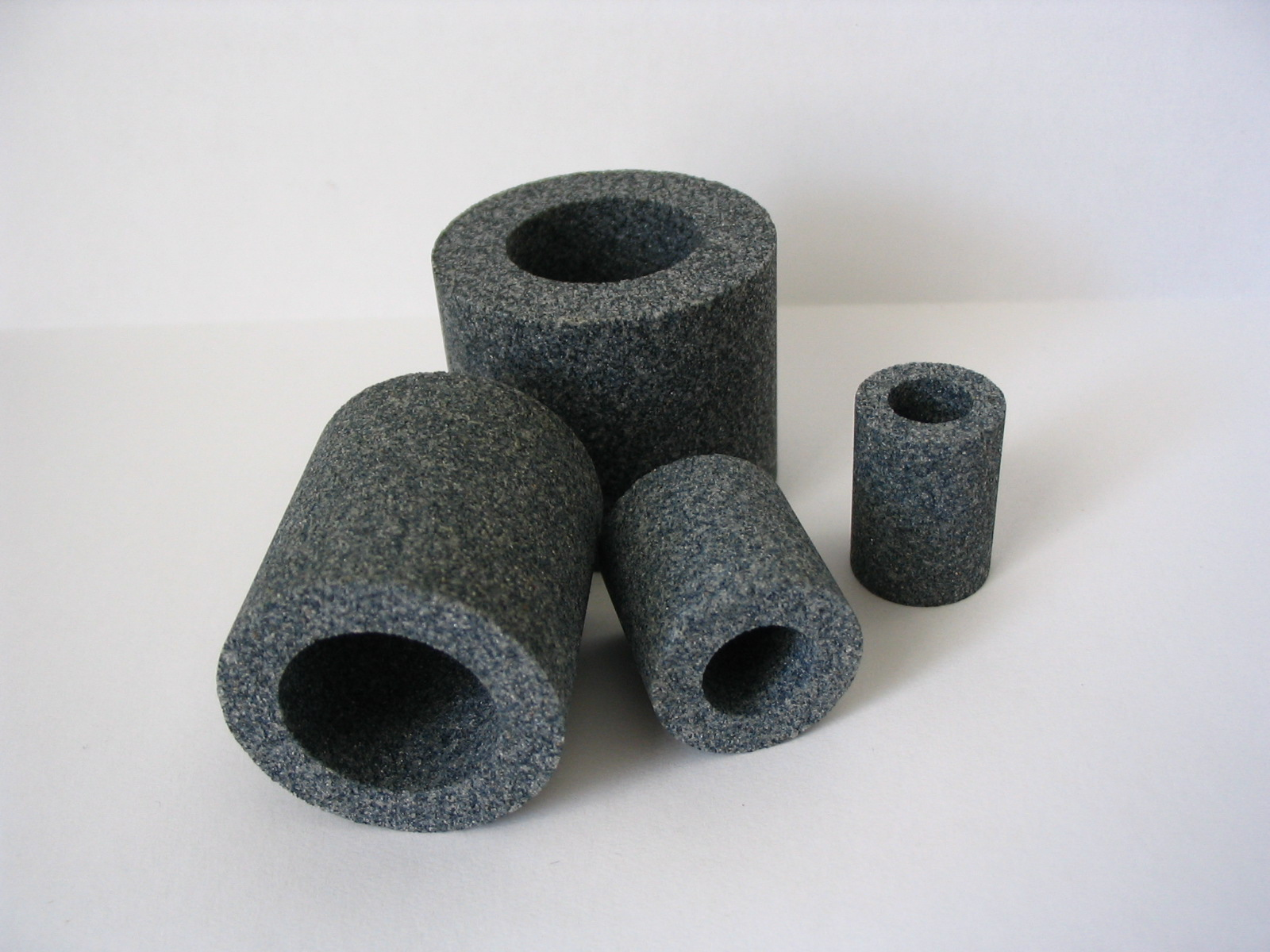
Assorted grinding wheels as examples of bonded abrasives.

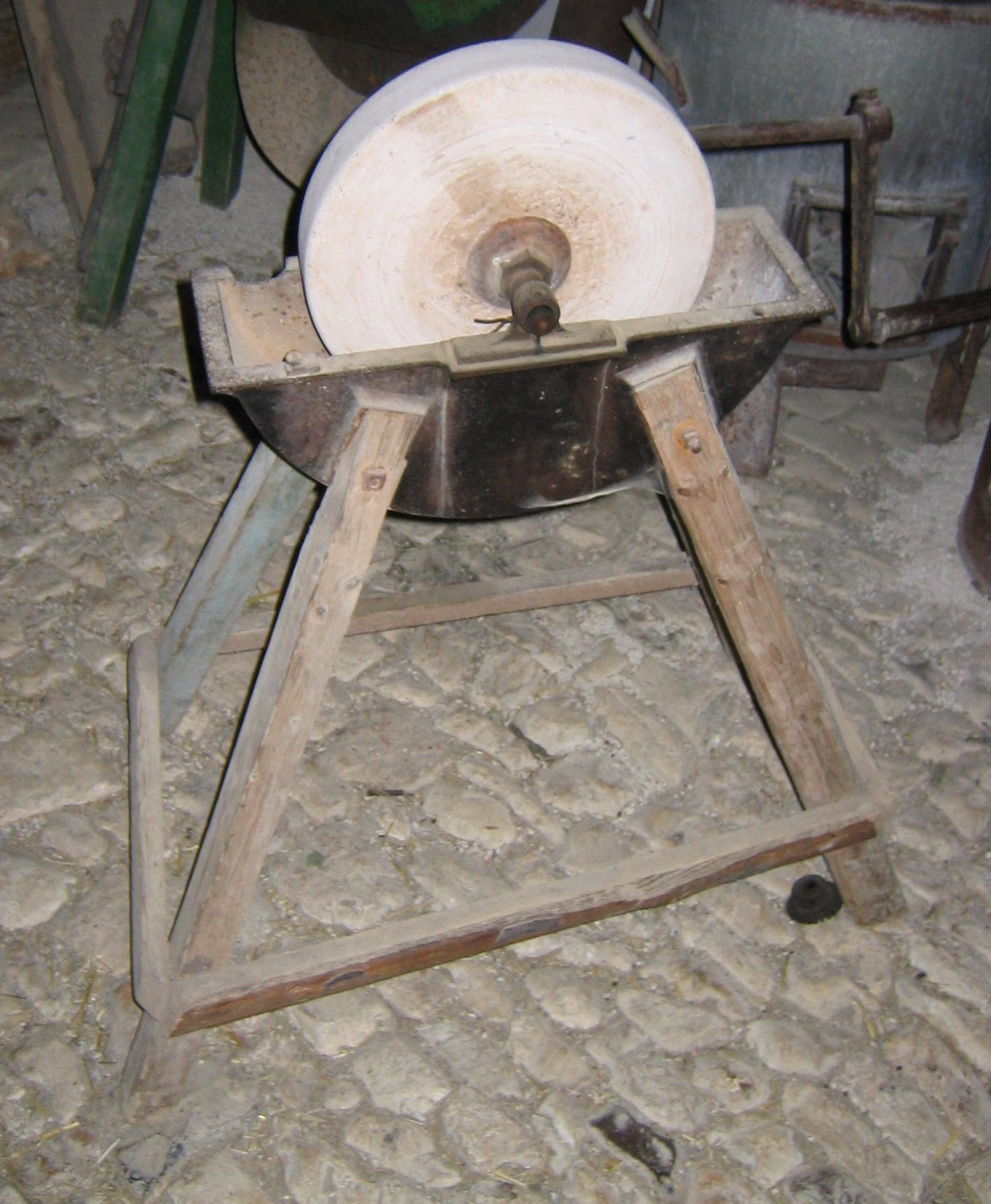
A grinding wheel with a reservoir to hold water as a lubricant and coolant.

A bonded abrasive is composed of an abrasive material contained within a matrix, although very fine aluminium oxide abrasive may comprise sintered material. This matrix is called a binder and is often a clay, a resin, a glass or a rubber. This mixture of binder and abrasive is typically shaped into blocks, sticks, or wheels. The most common abrasive used is aluminium oxide. Also common are silicon carbide, tungsten carbide and garnet. Artificial sharpening stones are often a bonded abrasive and are readily available as a two sided block, each side being a different grade of grit.

Grinding wheels are cylinders that are rotated at high speed. While once worked with a foot pedal or hand crank, the introduction of electric motors has made it necessary to construct the wheel to withstand greater radial stress to prevent the wheel flying apart as it spins. Similar issues arise with cutting wheels, which are often structurally reinforced with impregnated fibres. High relative speed between abrasive and workpiece often makes necessary the use of a lubricant of some kind. Traditionally, they were called coolants as they were used to prevent frictional heat build up which could damage the workpiece (such as ruining the temper of a blade). Some research suggests that the heat transport property of a lubricant is less important when dealing with metals as the metal will quickly conduct heat from the work surface. More important are their effects upon lessening tensile stresses while increasing some compressive stresses and reducing "thermal and mechanical stresses during chip formation".

Various shapes are also used as heads on rotary tools used in precision work, such as scale modelling.

Bonded abrasives need to be trued and dressed after they are used. Dressing is the cleaning of the waste material (swarf and loose abrasive) from the surface and exposing fresh grit. Depending upon the abrasive and how it was used, dressing may involve the abrasive being simply placed under running water and brushed with a stiff brush for a soft stone or the abrasive being ground against another abrasive, such as aluminium oxide used to dress a grinding wheel.

Truing is restoring the abrasive to its original surface shape. Wheels and stones tend to wear unevenly, leaving the cutting surface no longer flat (said to be "dished out" if it is meant to be a flat stone) or no longer the same diameter across the cutting face. This will lead to uneven abrasion and other difficulties.

=== Coated abrasives ===
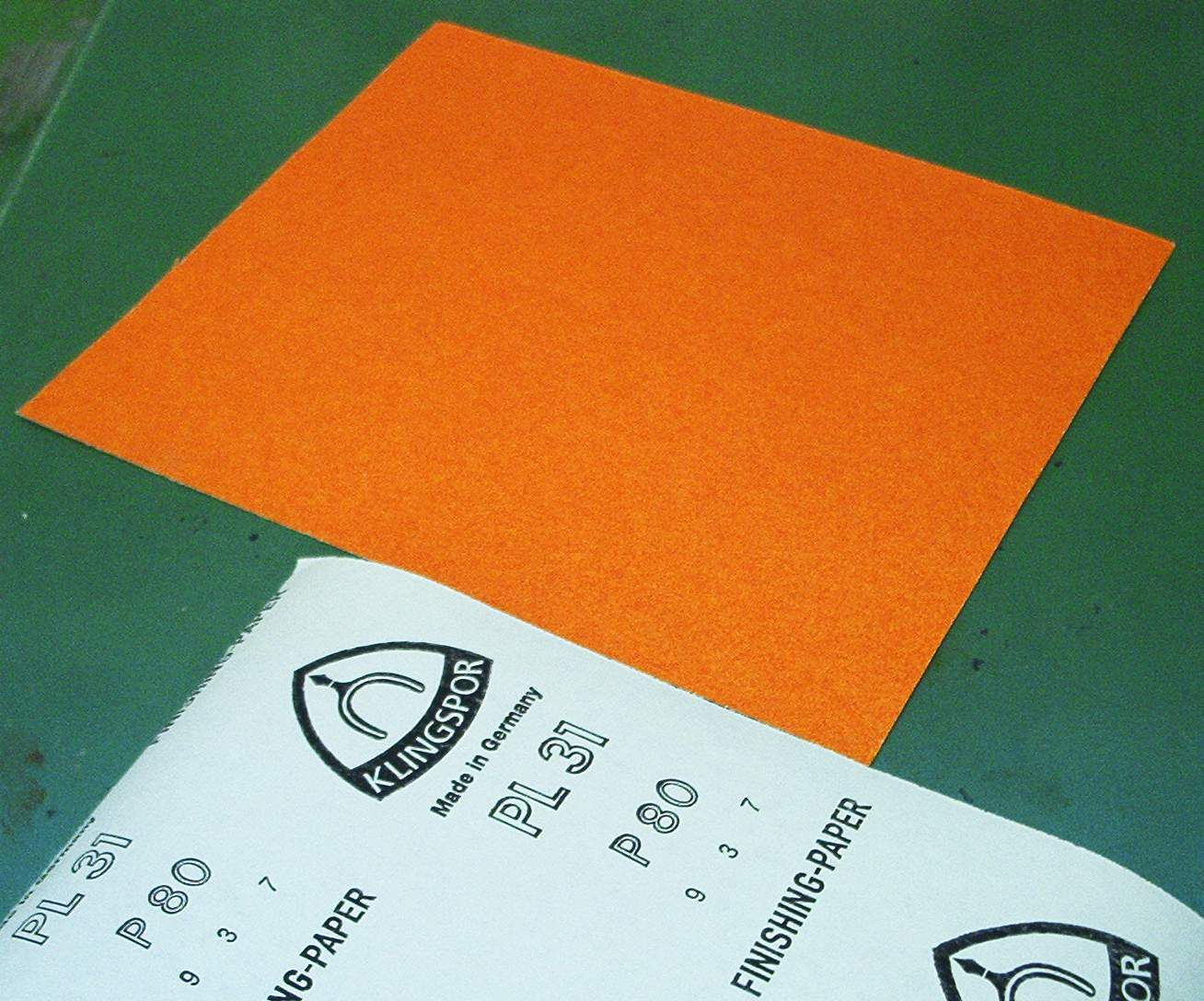
A German Klingspor sandpaper showing its backing and FEPA grit size.

A coated abrasive comprises an abrasive fixed to a backing material such as paper, cloth, rubber, resin, polyester or even metal, many of which are flexible. Sandpaper is a very common coated abrasive. Coated abrasives are most commonly the same minerals as are used for bonded abrasives. A bonding agent (often some sort of adhesive or resin) is applied to the backing to provide a flat surface to which the grit is then subsequently adhered. A woven backing may also use a filler agent (again, often a resin) to provide additional resilience.

Coated abrasives may be shaped for use in rotary and orbital sanders, for wrapping around sanding blocks, as handpads, as closed loops for use on belt grinders, as striking surfaces on matchboxes, on diamond plates and diamond steels. Diamond tools, though for cutting, are often abrasive in nature.

=== Other abrasives and their uses ===
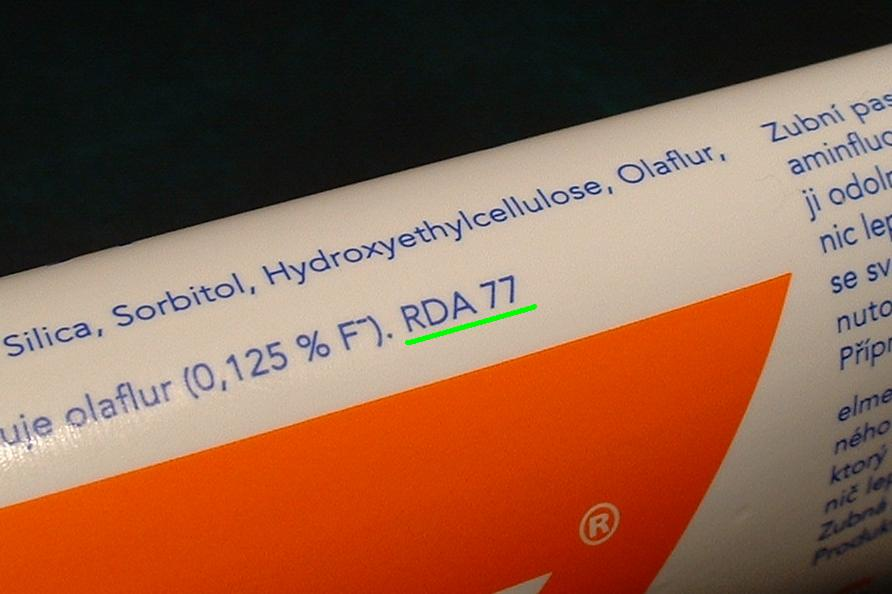
Here the abrasiveness of toothpaste is detailed by its Relative Dentin Abrasivity (RDA)

Sand, glass beads, metal pellets copper slag and dry ice may all be used for a process called sandblasting (or similar, such as the use of glass beads which is "bead blasting"). Dry ice will sublimate leaving behind no residual abrasive.

Cutting compound used on automotive paint is an example of an abrasive suspended in a liquid, paste or wax, as are some polishing liquids for silverware and optical media. The liquid, paste or wax acts as a binding agent that keeps the abrasive attached to the cloth which is used as a backing to move the abrasive across the work piece. On cars in particular, wax may serve as both a protective agent by preventing exposure of the paint of metal to air and also act as an optical filler to make scratches less noticeable. Toothpaste contains calcium carbonate or silica as a "polishing agent" to remove plaque and other matter from teeth as the hardness of calcium carbonate is less than that of tooth enamel but more than that of the contaminating agent.

Very fine rouge powder was commonly used for grinding glass, being somewhat replaced by modern ceramics, and is still used in jewellery making for a highly reflective finish.

Cleaning products may also contain abrasives suspended in a paste or cream. They are chosen to be reasonably safe on some linoleum, tile, metal or stone surfaces. However, many laminate surfaces and ceramic topped stoves are easily damaged by these abrasive compounds. Even ceramic/pottery tableware or cookware can damage these surfaces, particularly the bottom of the tableware, which is often unglazed in part or in whole and acts as simply another bonded abrasive.

Metal pots and stoves are often scoured with abrasive cleaners, typically in the form of the aforementioned cream or paste or of steel wool and non woven scouring pads which holds fine grits abrasives.

Human skin is also subjected to abrasion in the form of exfoliation. Abrasives for this can be much softer and more exotic than for other purposes and may include things like almond and oatmeal. Dermabrasion and microdermabrasion are now rather commonplace cosmetic procedures which use mineral abrasives.

Scratched compact discs and DVDs may sometimes be repaired through buffing with a very fine compound, the principle being that a multitude of small scratches will be more optically transparent than a single large scratch. However, this does take some skill and will eventually cause the protective coating of the disc to be entirely eroded (especially if the original scratch is deep), at which time, the data surface will be destroyed if abrasion continues.

Silicon carbide powders are commonly used as abrasive materials in various machining processes, including grinding, water-jet cutting, and sandblasting. These powders are effective for fine grinding or rough polishing of semiconductors, ceramics, and ferrous materials.

== Choice of abrasive ==
The shape, size and nature of the workpiece and the desired finish will influence the choice of the abrasive used. A bonded abrasive grind wheel may be used to commercially sharpen a knife (producing a hollow grind), but an individual may then sharpen the same knife with a natural sharpening stone or an even flexible coated abrasive (like a sandpaper) stuck to a soft, non-slip surface to make achieving a convex grind easier. Similarly, a brass mirror may be cut with a bonded abrasive, have its surface flattened with a coated abrasive to achieve a basic shape, and then have finer grades of abrasive successively applied culminating in a wax paste impregnated with rouge to leave a sort of "grainless finish" called, in this case, a "mirror finish".

Also, different shapes of adhesive may make it harder to abrade certain areas of the workpiece. Health hazards can arise from any dust produced (which may be ameliorated through the use of a lubricant) which could lead to silicosis (when the abrasive or workpiece is a silicate) and the choice of any lubricant. Besides water, oils are the most common lubricants. These may present inhalation hazards, contact hazards and, as friction necessarily produces heat, flammable material hazards.

An abrasive which is too hard or too coarse can remove too much material or leave undesired scratch marks. Besides being unsightly, scratching can have other, more serious effects. Excessive abrasion or the presence of scratches may:

- diminish or destroy usefulness (as in the case of scratching optical lenses and compact discs or dulling knives);
- trap dirt, water, or other material;
- increase surface area (permitting greater chemical reactivity such as increased rusting which is also affected by matter caught in scratches);
- erode or penetrate a coating (such as a paint or a chemical or wear resistant coating);
- overly quickly cause an object to wear away (such as a blade or a gemstone);
- increase friction (as in jeweled bearings and pistons).

A finer or softer abrasive will tend to leave much finer scratch marks which may even be invisible to the naked eye (a "grainless finish"); a softer abrasive may not even significantly abrade a certain object. A softer or finer abrasive will take longer to cut, as it tends to cut less deeply than a coarser, harder material. Also, the softer abrasive may become less effective more quickly as the abrasive is itself abraded. This allows fine abrasives to be used in the polishing of metal and lenses where the series of increasingly fine scratches tends to take on a much more shiny or reflective appearance or greater transparency. Very fine abrasives may be used to coat the strop for a cut-throat razors, however, the purpose of stropping is not to abrade material but to straighten the burr on an edge. The final stage of sharpening Japanese swords is called polishing and may be a form of superfinishing.

Different chemical or structural modifications may be made to alter the cutting properties of the abrasive.

Other very important considerations are price and availability. Diamond, for a long time considered the hardest substance in existence, is actually softer than fullerite and even harder aggregated diamond nanorods, both of which have been synthesised in laboratories, but no commercial process has yet been developed. Diamond itself is expensive due to scarcity in nature and the cost of synthesising it. Bauxite is a very common ore which, along with corundum's reasonably high hardness, contributes to corundum's status as a common, inexpensive abrasive.

Thought must be given to the desired task about using an appropriately hard abrasive. At one end, using an excessively hard abrasive wastes money by wearing it down when a cheaper, less hard abrasive would suffice. At the other end, if the abrasive substance is too soft, abrasion does not take place in a timely fashion, effectively wasting the abrasive as well as any accruing costs associated with loss of time.

== Other instances of abrasion ==
Aside from the aforementioned uses of shaping and finishing, abrasives may also be used to prepare surfaces for application of some sort of paint of adhesive. An excessively smooth surface may prevent paint and adhesives from adhering as strongly as an irregular surface could allow. Inflatable tyre repair kits (which, on bicycles particularly, are actually patches for the inner tube rather than the tyre) require use of an abrasive so that the self-vulcanising cement will stick strongly.

Inadvertently, people who use knives on glass or metal cutting boards are abrading their knife blades. The pressure at the knife edge can easily create microscopic (or even macroscopic) cuts in the board. This cut is a ready source of abrasive material as well as a channel full of this abrasive through which the edge slides. For this reason, and without regard for the health benefits, wooden boards are much more desirable. A similar occurrence arises with glass-cutters. Glass-cutters have circular blades that are designed to roll not slide. They should never retrace an already effected cut.

Undesired abrasion may result from the presence of carbon in internal combustion engines. While smaller particles are readily transported by the lubrication system, larger carbon particles may abrade components with close tolerances. The carbon arises from the excessive heating of engine oil or from incomplete combustion. This soot may contain fullerenes which are noted for their extreme hardness—and small size and limited quantity which would tend to limit their effect.

== See also ==
- Abrasion (mechanical)
- Abrasive blasting
- Erosion
- Steel abrasive
- Tribology
- Wear
