= ZTA =

ZTA may refer to:

- The IATA airport code for Tureia Airport in French Polynesia
- Zeta Tau Alpha, an American collegiate sorority
- Zirconia Toughened Alumina
- Zero Trust Architecture
- BZLF1, also known as Zta or EB1, a viral gene of the Epstein–Barr virus
