= Whiston, Staffordshire Moorlands =

Village in Staffordshire, England

Coordinates: 53.022°N 01.945°W

Whiston
- Location within Staffordshire
- District: Staffordshire Moorlands
- Shire county: Staffordshire
- Region: West Midlands
- Country: England
- Sovereign state: United Kingdom
- Post town: Stoke-on-Trent
- Postcode district: ST10
- Police: Staffordshire
- Fire: Staffordshire
- Ambulance: West Midlands
- UK Parliament: Staffordshire Moorlands

Whiston is a village in the Staffordshire Moorlands district of Staffordshire, England. Population details as taken at the 2011 census can be found under Kingsley. It is located within the Churnet Valley on the A52 road east of the village of Froghall.

== History ==
In 1769 the fifth Duke of Devonshire, William Cavendish, opened a new Lead and Copper smelting works, supplementing his mining works at nearby Ecton.

== See also ==
- Listed buildings in Kingsley, Staffordshire
