= Ice blasting (cleaning) =

Industrial cleaning method

Ice Blasting
- Industry: Industrial cleaning
- Application: Surface cleaning and preparation
- Fuel source: Water and Electricity

Ice blasting (also known as wet-ice blasting, frozen-ice blasting, or water-ice blasting) is a form of non-abrasive blasting where frozen water particles are combined with compressed air and propelled towards a surface for cleaning purposes. Ice is one of several different media commonly used for blast cleaning. Another common method of non-abrasive blasting is dry ice blasting, which uses solid carbon dioxide as a blast media. Other forms of abrasive blasting use mediums such as sand, plastic beads, and baking soda.

== History ==
The first ice blasting patent was filed in 1952, as a “means and methods for cleaning and polishing automobiles ” (US patent 2699403).

In 1959, Unilever filed a patent for using ice blasting to remove meat from bone.

== Method ==
Ice blasting is a method of industrial cleaning that uses a continuous supply of compressed air to accelerate suspended ice particles to high speeds. The ice particles are ejected from a nozzle toward the surface to be cleaned. The ice particles impact the contaminant covering the surface, breaking it apart and knocking it off.

Ice blasting uses significantly less water than pressure washing (around 10% of the water). As a result, one of its main advantages is easier containment compared to other industrial cleaning technologies. A wet spray forms around the surface during blasting, helping to capture airborne particulates and drag them downwards. Blasted off contaminants collect in a slushy pile beneath the blast zone. This means that, compared to other cleaning technologies, a more minimal containment setup can be used. In addition, much less waste is produced, since the minimal leftover slush melts and evaporates, leaving behind only the blasted off contaminant for disposal.

Since ice blasting results in less airborne contaminants than other blasting media and requires simpler containment setups, it is often used for removing hazardous substances, such as lead paint or asbestos, or for blasting in enclosed/indoor environments. It is also often used in areas where water is scarce since it requires much less water than pressure washing.

Ice blasting cleans in three main stages:

- Bulk Removal: The stage where major contamination is first removed. Speeding particles of ice impact the surface, breaking apart the layer of contaminant and knocking it off. Since ice is a solid, it can deliver a much higher impulse force on impact than liquid water.
- Detail Cleaning: The stage where ice slides along the surfaces of the part. This provides a mechanical agitation that scrubs and polishes the surface, removing minute quantities of the remaining contamination from the surface. By definition, scrubbing means two solids moving relative to each other under applied pressure. Water as a blast-cleaning agent therefore cannot offer this property.
- Final Rinse: The removed contamination is rinsed away. Some of the ice melts on impact to form water, which washes over the surface. Water is considered the universal solvent and so dissolves and washes away remaining contaminants.

These cleaning mechanisms often leave metal surfaces much shinier than other cleaning methods.

== Applications ==
Ice blasting can be used to clean many different surfaces and has applications across multiple industries. The minimal water usage and the absence of chemical ingredients provides a relatively eco-friendly cleaning solution. Also, ice blasting does not damage the surfaces being cleaned.

=== Lead paint/Asbestos Removal ===
In paint-stripping, ice blasting is used to overcome the cohesive bond of the coating. Depending on the paint or makeup of the bond, some coatings cannot be cleaned. Ice blasting is useful in removing lead paint, as it poses the least danger. Ice blasting has the lowest level of airborne contaminants for blasting technology in removing lead paint. Ice particles produce a blast mist, which helps to suppress dust or airborne particulates to minimize unintended dispersion. This characteristic of ice blast is of particular interest in terms of worker health and safety in the abatement process of asbestos and lead-based paint.

=== Molds ===
Ice blasting technology allows for thorough and efficient cleaning for molds in a wide range of industries, including tire manufacturing, automotive production, and packaging plants. Since the method is non-abrasive, the cleanings will not damage molding surfaces. Ice blasting can be used on hot or cold molds, reducing the downtime in production facilities. Ice sublimates on impact, so entrapment of the blasting media is not a concern. Grit entrapment is the reason abrasive media such as sand cannot be used to clean online.

=== Deburring ===
In some applications, material removal is achieved without abrasion. This is particularly common in the removal of fine burrs arising from machined aluminum such as automatic transmission components, and small flashings from castings. In these situations, the metal is loosely attached to the parent metal and hence can be readily displaced by the momentum of the blasting agent. No abrasive erosion takes place as the remaining metal does not exhibit a smooth or rounded edge.

=== Oil/Grease ===
The scrubbing pressure of ice particles can be up to 300 bar. In many applications in oil and grease removal, ice blasting can produce essentially oil-free surfaces. In some metal finishing operations, ice blast has been shown to be superior to conventional acid pickling.

=== Rust ===
Ice blast is not abrasive. It does not remove strongly adherent tough coatings as abrasive media would. However, ice blast can remove coatings with weakened adhesion resulting from coating defects or corrosion. As an ice particle impacts on a coating, it causes a compressive stress on the coating and target system. On impact, the ice particle melts. The coating and target system under compressive stress will react in the opposite direction, producing a tensile stress. When the tensile stress exceeds the coating adhesion force, coating lifting takes place. The lifted coating is in the force of chips and is carried by the residual water.

=== Other uses ===
Ice blasting has applications in many industries and is a solution for companies that value effective use of water, a low environmental impact, and low cost. The technology has been used for aerospace, chemical removal, nuclear decontamination, and municipal cleaning.

== Safety ==
As with all blasting technology, proper eyewear and hearing protection is recommended. Blasting machines reach levels of 115 db. Depending on the contaminants being cleaned, the level of protection varies. However, ice blasting is the safest blasting technology because of the lack of air pollutants consistent with other blasting technology. Generally, light rain gear is sufficient protection. If ice blasting is used to clean hazardous materials, heavier protective clothing is recommended.

== See also ==
- Abrasive blasting
- Dry-ice blasting
- Sand-blasting
- Pressure washer
