= Listed buildings in Kingsley, Staffordshire =

Kingsley is a civil parish in the district of Staffordshire Moorlands, Staffordshire, England. It contains 46 listed buildings that are recorded in the National Heritage List for England. All the listed buildings are designated at Grade II, the lowest of the three grades, which is applied to "buildings of national importance and special interest". The parish contains the villages of Kingsley, Kingsley Holt, and Whiston, and is otherwise rural. Most of the listed buildings are farmhouses and farm buildings, and the other listed buildings include private houses and cottages, a church and items in the churchyard, a bridge, former lime kilns, a former workhouse converted into cottages, a milestone, and five mileposts

== Buildings ==
Name and location	Photograph	Date	Notes
St Werburgh's Church; 53.01955°N 1.98153°W		13th century	The tower was raised in the 14th century, the nave dates from 1820, and the chancel was added in 1886. The church is built in stone, the nave has a slated roof, and the roof of the chancel is tiled. It consists of a nave, a south porch, a chancel, and a west tower. The tower have four stages, diagonal buttresses, a west door with a Tudor arch, a west window, a string course with gargoyles, and an embattled parapet.
Hollins Farmhouse; 53.02519°N 2.01052°W	—	16th century	The farmhouse was refronted in the 18th century and altered in the 19th century. It has a timber framed core, with exposed timber framing at the rear, brick at the front, and a tile roof. There are two storeys and three bays. The doorway and the windows, which are three-light casements, have segmental heads.
44 High Street; 53.01986°N 1.98477°W	—	17th century	The house, which was altered in the 19th century, is in stone with a string course, and a tile roof with verge parapets on corbelled kneelers. There are two storeys, an attic and a cellar, and three bays. The gable end faces the street, and the house is on a slope, with a full-height cellar also facing the street. There are some mullioned windows, and others have been replaced by casements. There are two doorways, one with a heavy lintel, and a double cellar door with an arched concrete lintel.
Booths Farmhouse; 53.00478°N 1.99223°W	—	17th century	A stone farmhouse with a moulded string course, and a tile roof with verge parapets and pitched copings. There is one storey and an attic, and two bays. In the ground floor are three-sided flat-roofed bay windows, the upper floor contains gabletted dormers, and to the left is a two-storey gabled porch with a Tudor arched entrance. In the right gable end are two windows with chamfered mullions and cornices.
Eavesford Farmhouse; 53.01774°N 1.95129°W	—	17th century	The farmhouse is in red sandstone and has a tile roof with verge parapets and pitched copings. There are two storeys and an attic, and an L-shaped plan with a front of three bays. The windows are casements in chamfered reveals.
Barn northeast of Eavesford Farmhouse; 53.01793°N 1.95070°W	—	17th century	The barn, which was extended in 1840, is in stone and has a tile roof with coped verges. There is an L-shaped plan, and two levels, consisting of haylofts over cattle sheds. It contains doorways, one with a lintel inscribed with the date, initials and a coat of arms.
Elm Tree Farmhouse; 53.02040°N 1.98552°W	—	17th century	The farmhouse, which was altered in the 19th and 20th centuries, is in stone, and has a tile roof with verge parapets. There are two storeys, and a T-shaped plan, with a main range of two bays, and a gabled wing. In the main range are chamfered mullioned windows in the ground floor, and 20th-century casements above. The wing contains sash windows and a doorway with a Tudor arch.
Hazles Farmhouse; 53.02867°N 1.99777°W	—	17th century	The farmhouse was largely rebuilt in the 19th century. The remaining original parts are in stone, the rebuilding is in brick, the roof is tiled, and has verge parapets with pitched coping. There are two storeys, a projecting gable to the left, and a flat-roofed extension in the angle. The windows are casements, and there are two owl holes in the apex of the gable.
Locker Farmhouse; 53.02412°N 1.94106°W	—	17th century	The farmhouse was extended in the 18th and 19th centuries. It is in stone and has a tile roof with verge parapets and pitched copings. There are two storeys and an attic, and a T-shaped plan consisting of a four-bay main range and a rear wing. The windows vary, some have chamfered mullions, and some are 19th-century casements.
Barn southeast of Locker Farm; 53.02392°N 1.94073°W	—	17th century	The barn is in stone with an eaves band and a tile roof. There are two levels, consisting of a loft over a cow shed. The barn has three openings, two with heavy lintels, two with inserted casement windows.
Long Croft Farmhouse; 53.00705°N 1.99008°W	—	17th century	A stone farmhouse, partly rebuilt in brick, with a tile roof that has verge parapets with pitched copings on corbelled kneelers. There is a single storey and an attic, and a T-shaped plan, with a front of three bays, a projecting gabled cross-wing on the left, and a single-storey porch in the angle. The windows have chamfered mullions, and there is a gabled dormer.
Barn 10 metres southeast of The Leys Farmhouse; 53.02229°N 1.95551°W	—	17th century	The barn is in stone with a chamfered eaves band, and a tile roof with verge parapets. There are two levels built into a slope, with one storey on the road front. On the west side are two large openings, and on the north side is a blocked loft door.
Barn 30 metres southeast of The Leys Farmhouse; 53.02215°N 1.95544°W	—	17th century	The barn is in stone with a moulded eaves band, and a tile roof that has verge parapets with pitched coping. There are two levels, on the southeast side are vents in both levels and a central entrance, and on the northwest side is another opening.
Springfield Farm; 53.02043°N 1.95629°W	—	Late 17th century	The farmhouse is in stone with a tile roof, two storeys, and two bays. To the right are brick stables, and to the left is a lower extension. There is a blocked doorway with a heavy lintel, and some of the windows have retained their chamfered mullions.
Church Farmhouse; 53.01704°N 1.98147°W	—	1700	The farmhouse was partly rebuilt in the 18th century and altered in the 20th century. The original part is in stone with a string course, the rebuilding is in brick, and the roof is tiled with verge parapets on corbelled kneelers. There are two storeys and three bays. To the left is a gabled porch dated over the entrance, above it is a blind two-light window with chamfered mullions, and the other windows are 20th-century casements.
Barn north of Hollins Farmhouse; 53.02545°N 2.01051°W	—	Late 17th or early 18th century	A stone barn that has a tile roof with verge parapets. There are two levels, consisting of a hay loft over cow sheds. The barn has four entries, one with a heavy lintel, and one with a Tudor arched lintel and converted into a window.
Barn south of Hollins Farmhouse; 53.02467°N 2.01082°W	—	Late 17th or early 18th century	The barn is in stone with a chamfered eaves band, and a tile roof that has verge parapets with pitched copings. There are two levels, consisting of a hay loft over cow sheds, and two openings with heavy lintels.
Oldridge Farmhouse; 53.02961°N 1.93784°W	—	1723	A stone farmhouse on a plinth, that has a tile roof with verge parapets on corbelled kneelers, pitched copings and ball finials. There are two storeys and an attic, a front of three bays and a projecting gabled wing on the right. The windows have chamfered mullions, some with hood moulds, and to the right of the doorway is a round-arched window with a dated lintel.
Donor Reeves memorial 53.01943°N 1.98157°W	—	Early 18th century	The memorial is in the churchyard of St Werburgh's Church, and is to the memory of Donor Reeves. It is a chest tomb in stone, and has a heavy rounded and slightly domed top slab. On the west side is an inscription.
Barn southwest of Elm Tree Farmhouse; 53.02040°N 1.98577°W	—	Early 18th century	The barn is in stone with a chamfered eaves band and a tile roof. There are two levels, consisting of a hay loft over cow sheds. The barn contains a doorway with a heavy lintel, and slit vents.
Barn north of Banks Farm; 53.02137°N 1.97540°W	—	18th century	The barn is in stone with a stepped eaves course, and a tile roof with verge parapets. There are two levels, consisting of a hay loft over cow sheds. On the east side are entrances with heavy lintels, now blocked with inserted casement windows.
Froghall Bridge; 53.02196°N 1.96481°W		18th century	The bridge carries the A52 road over the River Churnet and the Churnet Valley Railway, the road bridge being extended to cross the railway in the 19th century. It is in rusticated stone, and consists of two elliptical arches.
Little Eaves Farmhouse; 53.01064°N 1.94019°W	—	18th century	A stone farmhouse that has a tile roof with verge parapets. There are two storeys and a T-shaped plan consisting of a four-bay range and a gabled wing. In the centre is a doorway, and the windows vary; some have chamfered mullions, and some are casements.
Barn east of Little Eaves Farmhouse; 53.01068°N 1.93994°W	—	18th century	The barn is in stone and has a tile roof with verge parapets. There is one storey, on the east front are four vents, and on the south gable end are external steps leading up to a doorway.
Milestone southwest of Little Green Head Farm; 53.01853°N 2.02777°W		Mid 18th century	The milestone is on the north side of the A52 road. The stone has a rounded top, and carries a 19th-century cast iron plate with the distances to Leek and Cheadle.
The Leys Farmhouse; 53.02248°N 1.95584°W	—	Mid 18th century	The oldest part of the farmhouse is the wing, the main range dating from the early 19th century; both parts have tiled roofs. The main range is in stone faced with brick, it has a dentilled eaves band, three storeys and three bays. The central doorway and the windows, which are casements, have segmental heads. The wing is in stone and is gabled with verge parapets. There are two storeys, a storey band and the windows are mullioned casements.
The Leys "Horseshoe House"; 53.02188°N 1.95465°W	—	1772	The farmhouse is in red brick facing stone, with stone dressings and quoins. There are two storeys and an attic, three bays, and two parallel ranges. The central window has a gabled hood and a dated lintel, and the windows are casements with segmental heads and keystones. One gable end contains mullioned casement windows, and the other has small-pane casements and a verge parapet.
New Hall Farmhouse; 53.02073°N 1.98660°W	—	Late 18th century	The farmhouse, which was extended in the 19th century, is in stone, with some brick, and has a tile roof with verge parapets, pitched coping, and corbelled kneelers. There are two storeys and a T-shaped plan, with a projecting gabled wing in stone to the right, a recessed range, mainly in brick, and a lower wing to the left. In the gabled wing the windows have chamfered mullions, and in the recessed range they are casements.
Stables north of Shawe Park; 53.01193°N 1.98975°W	—	Late 18th century	The stable block is red brick with a hipped tile roof. There are two levels, consisting of a hay loft over stables, and an L-shaped plan, with a main range and a short projecting wing on the left with a lean-to extension. In the upper level are two tiers of slit vents, and the ground floor contains six round-arched entries with small-pane fanlights, and two windows.
Gate, piers and wall, St Werburgh's Church; 53.01885°N 1.98191°W	—	c. 1820	At the entrance to the churchyard are square gate piers with inset pointed panels and pyramidal cappings. Between them is a scrolled wrought iron overthrow, and cast iron gates.
Cottage Farmhouse; 53.02429°N 1.96251°W	—	Early 19th century	The farmhouse is in rendered brick and has a tile roof. There are two storeys, and four bays, including a projecting gable. The central doorway has a moulded architrave and a cornice, and the windows are sashes with raised moulded surrounds.
Lime kilns, Froghall; 53.02603°N 1.96100°W		Early 19th century	The lime kilns are in sandstone and lined in brick. The retaining wall is about 12 metres (39 ft) high and about 50 metres (160 ft) long, and is divided into six bays. The entrances are round-arched on impost bands, and above each arch is a dentilled band.
Moorland Cottages; 53.02235°N 1.94267°W	—	Early 19th century	Originally a workhouse, later divided into three cottages, the building is in stone with a tile roof. There are two storeys and six bays. At the left end is a converted stable; this contains casement windows, and the other windows are sashes. There are three doorways, the right doorway with a cornice on corbels.
The Glebe; 53.02149°N 1.98901°W	—	Early 19th century	The house, which possibly has an 18th-century core, is in red brick with stone dressings, and has a tile roof with verge parapets on kneelers. There are two storeys and an attic, and a symmetrical front of three bays, the outer bays projecting and gabled with finials. In the outer bays are bow windows, and the other windows have chamfered mullions.
Stable House Farmhouse; 53.02136°N 1.94317°W	—	Early to mid 19th century	The farmhouse is built from moulded copper slag blocks with some rendering, and has a tile roof with verge parapets. There are two storeys and two bays. The windows are small-pane casements, and the entrance is at the rear.
Barn 2 metres east of Stable House Farmhouse; 53.02138°N 1.94299°W	—	Early to mid 19th century	The barn is built from moulded copper slag blocks with sandstone dressings, and has a tile roof with verge parapets. There are two levels, and the barn contains four two-light chamfered mullioned windows and a doorway. In the right gable end is a round-arched entrance approached by a flight of steps.
Barn 20 metres east of Stable House Farmhouse; 53.02133°N 1.94271°W	—	Early to mid 19th century	The barn is built from moulded copper slag blocks with sandstone dressings, and has a tile roof with verge parapets. There are two levels, consisting of a hay loft over a stable and cattle shed, and a lean-to on the right. The openings include a loft door, a stable door with a segmental head, and another doorway.
Alcock memorial 53.01955°N 1.98183°W	—	1838	The memorial is in the churchyard of St Werburgh's Church, and is to the memory of Samuel Alcock. It is a chest tomb in stone, and has a deep twin-stepped podium, a moulded plinth, pilasters at the angles, incised sides, and a moulded ridged top slab.
Locker memorial 53.01933°N 1.98159°W	—	1838	The memorial is in the churchyard of St Werburgh's Church, and is to the memory of Joseph Locker. It is a chest tomb in stone, and has fluted consoles at the angles, side panels with fans at the angles, and an inscribed top slab.
Hempson memorial and enclosure 53.01943°N 1.98134°W	—	1840	The memorial is in the churchyard of St Werburgh's Church, and is to the memory of Hanna Hempson. It is a chest tomb in stone on a two-tiered stepped plinth, with fluted pilasters at the angles, inscribed side panels, and a moulded top slab. The kerb of the enclosure, originally with railings, is still present.
Peak House; 53.01704°N 1.97914°W	—	1870s	A rectory, later a private house, it is in red brick with a moulded floor band, a moulded eaves band, and a hipped tile roof. There are two storeys, and an asymmetrical front of three bays. The right bay contains single-light trefoil-headed windows with a gablet over the top floor window. To the left is a two-storey gabled porch containing a doorway with a Tudor arch and moulded pilasters, and flanked by diagonal buttresses. Above it is a window, and a trefoil in the apex. The left bay is also gabled, and contains a bay window with a hipped roof.
Milepost at SK 002 470; 53.02031°N 1.99869°W		Early 20th century (possible)	The milepost is on the south side of the A52 road. It is in cast iron and has a triangular plan and a sloping top. On the top is "KINGSLEY" and on the sides are the distances to Hanley, Stoke, Newcastle, Froghall, and Ashbourne.
Milepost at SK 016 470; 53.02051°N 1.97680°W		Early 20th century (possible)	The milepost is on the southeast side of the A52 road. It is in cast iron and has a triangular plan and a sloping top. On the top is "KINGSLEY" and on the sides are the distances to Hanley, Stoke, Newcastle, Froghall, and Ashbourne.
Milepost at SK 029 474; 53.02527°N 1.95698°W		Early 20th century (possible)	The milepost is on the west side of the A52 road. It is in cast iron and has a triangular plan and a sloping top. On the top is "WHISTON" and on the sides are the distances to Hanley, Stoke, Cheadle, Newcastle, Froghall, and Ashbourne.
Milepost at SK 041 474; 53.02409°N 1.93886°W		Early 20th century (possible)	The milepost is on the southeast side of the A52 road. It is in cast iron and has a triangular plan and a sloping top. On the top is "WHISTON" and on the sides are the distances to Froghall, Cheadle, Hanley, Stoke, Newcastle, and Ashbourne.
Milepost at SK 018 460; 53.01124°N 1.97427°W		Early 20th century (possible)	The milepost is on the southeast side of the A521 road. It is in cast iron and has a triangular plan and a sloping top. On the top is "KINGSLEY HOLT" and on the sides are the distances to Froghall, Ipstones, Onecote, Warslow, Longnor, Buxton, and Cheadle.
