= Cutting compound =

Cutting compound consists of an abrasive suspended in a paste. Like most abrasives, it comes in various grit sizes dependent upon how much matter is to be removed. It is used on automotive paintwork to cut through (abrade) oxidised paint or to polish out scratches in the paintwork. The oxidised paint is duller than fresh paint and the cutting compound is used to expose this fresher surface. Modern automotive painting often includes a thin, transparent protective coating on which cutting compound should not be used. Cutting is not something that should necessarily be done often as it will eventually strip all the paint from the surface, which is both less appealing and offers less chemical resistance. Waxing to protect the newly exposed surface is an important part of maintenance.
