= Soda blasting =

Abrasive blasting technique using sodium bicarbonate

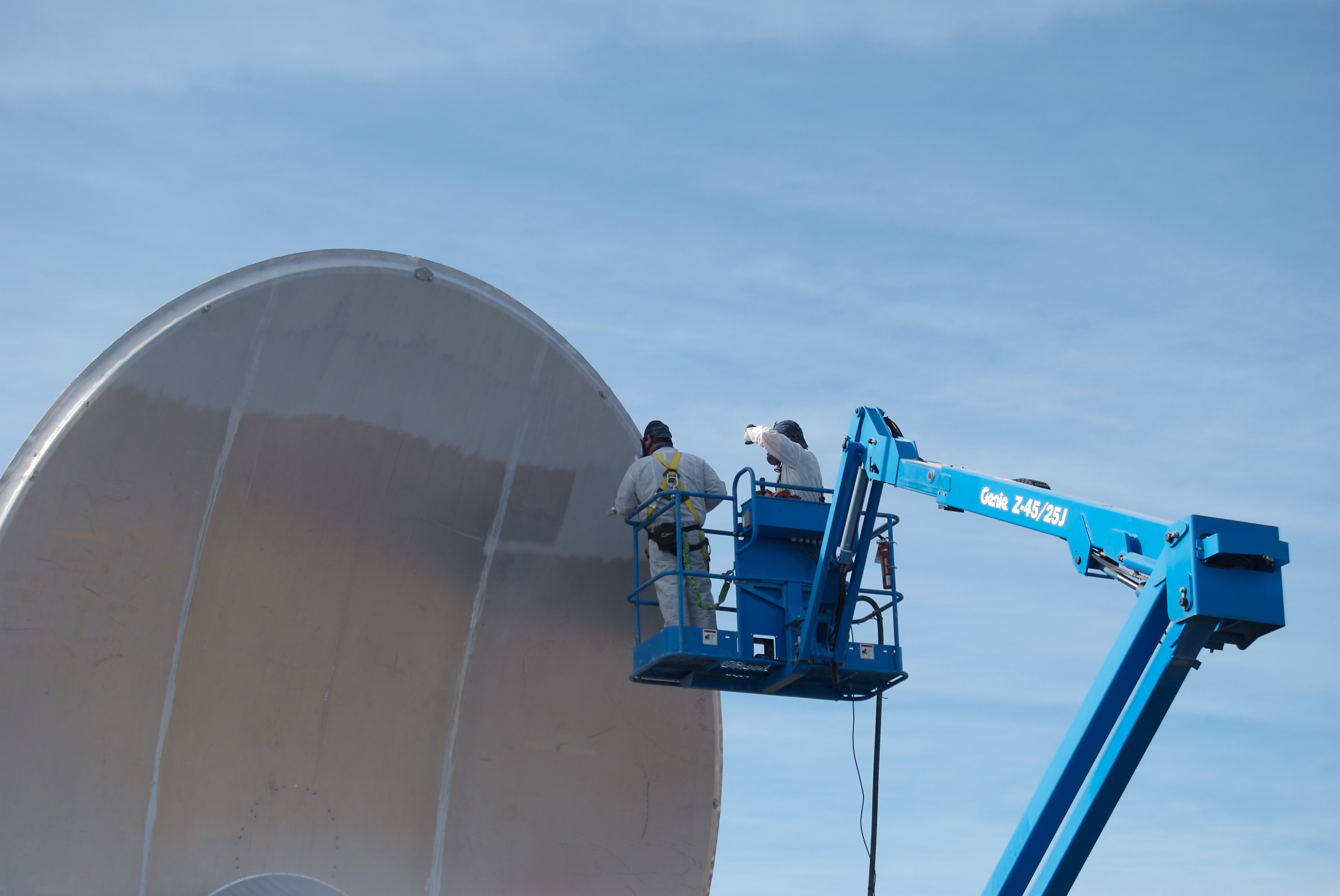
Soda blasting a radio dish at Hat Creek Radio Observatory

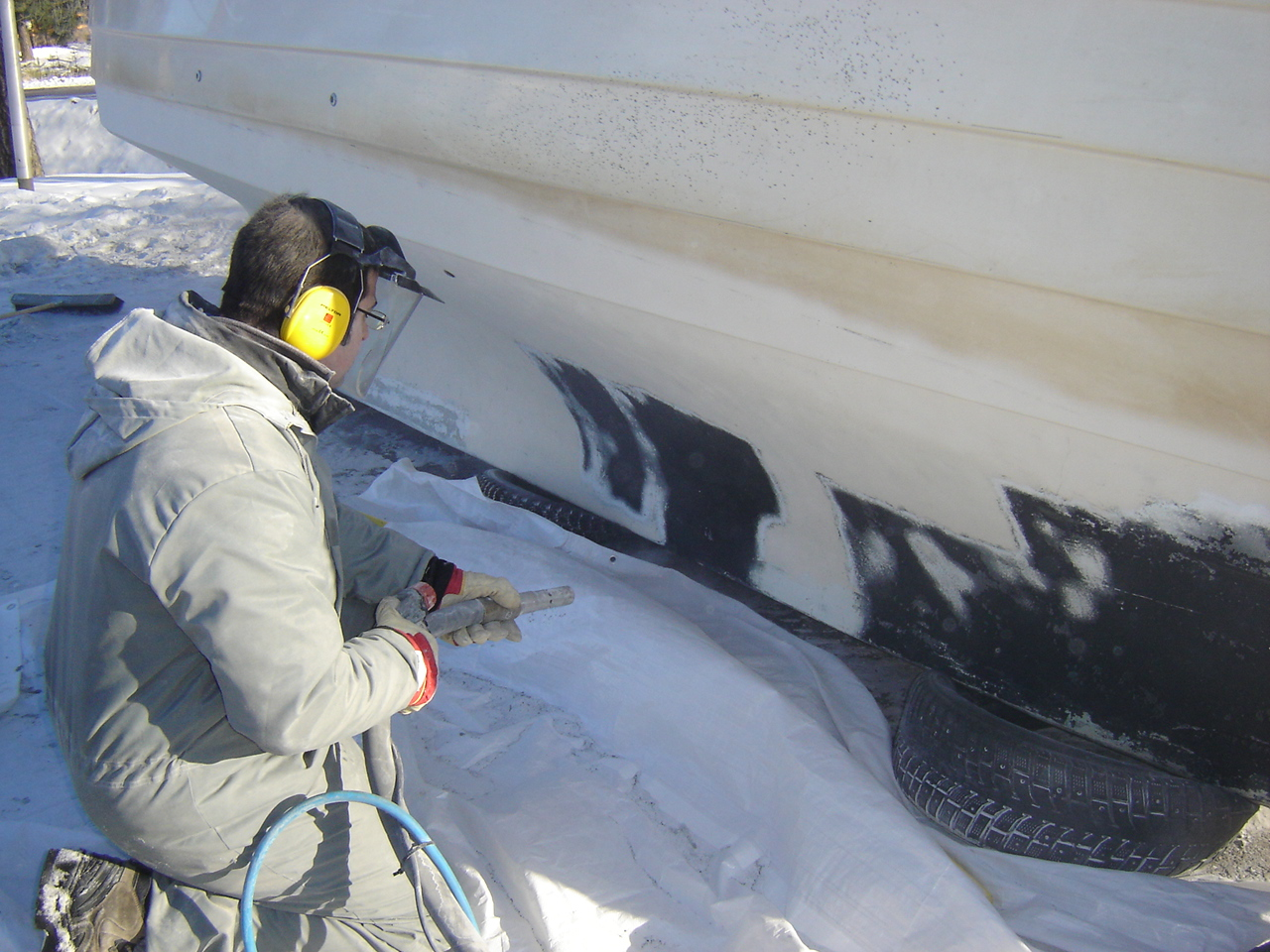
Soda blasting

Soda blasting is a mild form of abrasive blasting in which sodium bicarbonate particles are blasted against a surface using compressed air. It has a much milder abrasive effect than sandblasting. An early use was in the conservation-restoration of the Statue of Liberty in the 1980s.

Soda blasting is a non-destructive method for many applications in cleaning, paint and varnish stripping, automotive restoration, industrial equipment maintenance, rust removal, graffiti removal, molecular steel passivation against rust, oil removal by saponification and translocation, masonry cleaning and restoration, soot remediation, boat hull cleaning and for food processing facilities and equipment and tooth cleaning at the dental laboratory.

== Applications ==
Soda blasting can be used for cleaning timber, wood, oak beams, oak floors, doors, stairs & banisters, cars, boat hulls, masonry, and food processing equipment. Soda blasting can also be used to remove graffiti and to clean structural steel. Soda blasting is very effective for mold and fire/smoke damage cleanup as it cleans and deodorizes.

== Equipment ==
A soda blaster is a self-contained system that includes a blast generator, high pressure compressed air, moisture decontamination system, blast hose, and a blast nozzle. The blasting material consists of formulated sodium bicarbonate (also known as baking soda). Blasting soda is an extremely friable material that undergoes micro fragmentation on impact, literally exploding away surface materials without damage to the substrate. Since sodium bicarbonate is much softer than the silicon carbide or aluminium oxide used in sandblasting, the blast nozzle used for soda blasting applications can be made of soft metals such as brass or steel. The pressures used are very low compared to those used in sandblasting, e.g., 20psi as opposed to 120psi.
