= Kingsley, Staffordshire =

Village in Staffordshire, United Kingdom

Coordinates: 53.020°N 1.988°W

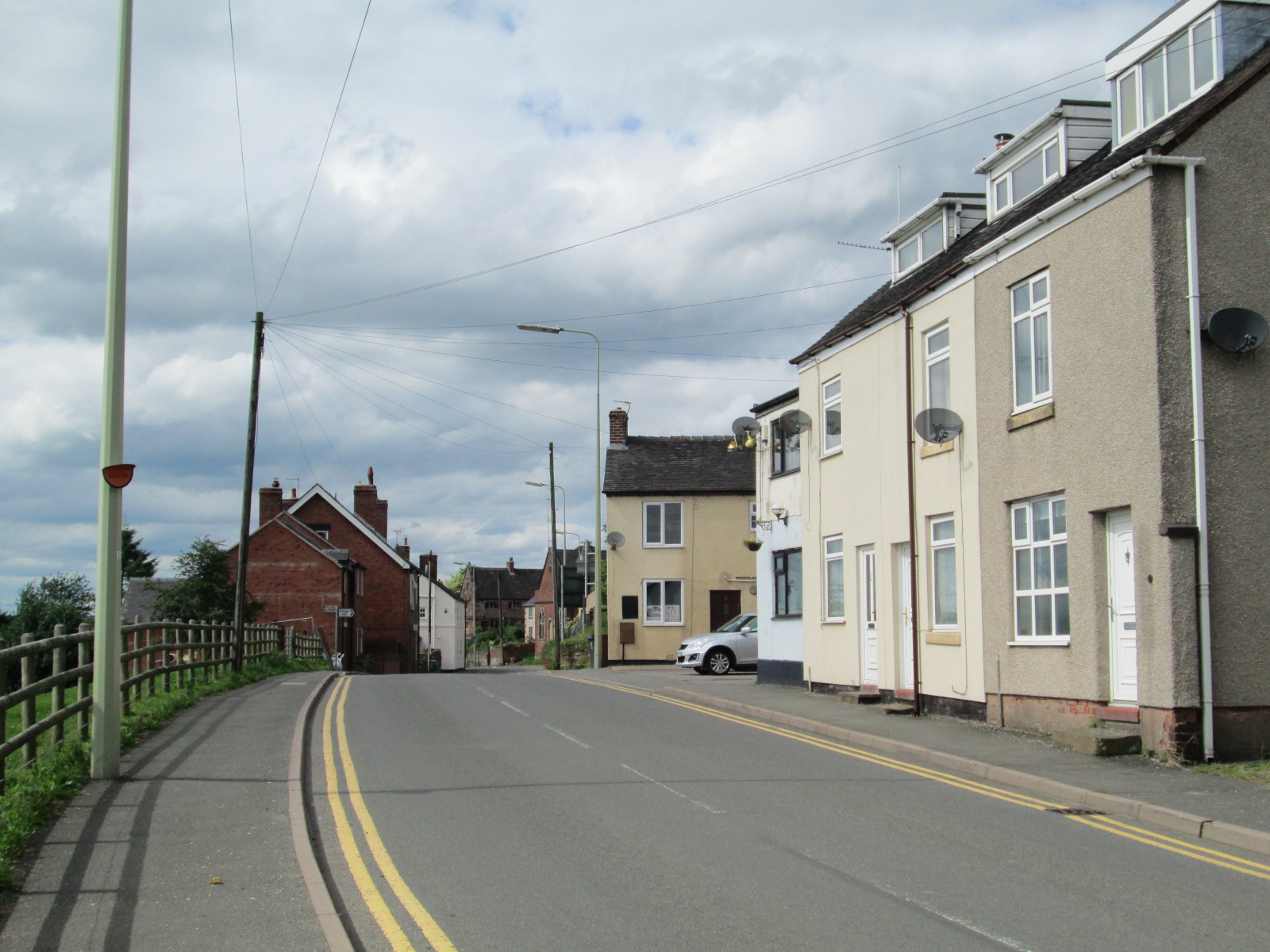
High Street, Kingsley

Kingsley is a small village in the Staffordshire Moorlands near to Cheadle, and situated on the A52 from Stoke on Trent to Ashbourne. The civil parish population taken at the 2011 census was 2,204.

Nowadays Kingsley is a quiet rural village, but until the early 20th century it was the centre of the Churnet Valley iron mining industry. Partly as a result the village then had many pubs but none exist today. The Bull's Head closed in 2019 and re-opened in October 2022 as a shop; The Old Swan Pub has been converted into a large family house; and The Plough has been demolished and houses have been built where the pub and its car park once were. There are no longer any other shops within the village when there once were butchers shops, grocery shops, a haberdashers etc.

The village is close to Alton Towers.

The one school is called St Werburghs Primary School, named after the local Church of England parish church.

Kingsley appears to be a well kept village but public footpaths are often left overgrown and completely impassable, making hiking unpleasant.

== See also ==
- Listed buildings in Kingsley, Staffordshire
