= Copper slag =

By-product of copper extraction

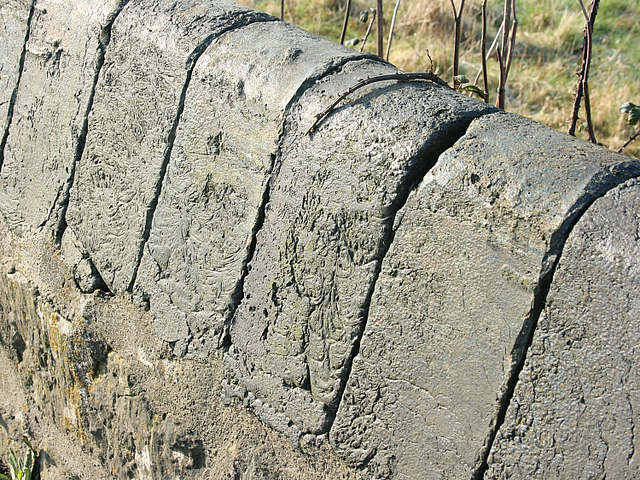
Copper slag, Kelston Park

Copper slag is a by-product of copper extraction by smelting. During smelting, impurities become slag which floats on the molten metal. Slag that is quenched in water produces angular granules which are disposed of as waste or utilized as discussed below.

== Characteristics ==
Slag from ores that are mechanically concentrated before smelting contain mostly iron oxides and silicon oxides.

== Life cycle analysis of copper slag aggregate ==
Copper slag is created during the copper smelting process. Around 4.5 million tons of copper slag is produced each year. Although copper slag is used in grit blasting and landfilling, only 15 to 20% of it is being used as of 2015. Since this is a heavily wasted material, finding ways to use it in different industries can reduce overall waste. One study done by the School of Resources and Safety Engineering at Central South University in Changsha, China explores copper slag as a concrete aggregate. This study specifically examines the environmental benefits of copper slag. By performing a life cycle assessment on regular concrete and concrete with copper slag aggregate, the researchers were able to compare the carbon emissions of both materials and how sensitive the materials are to change.

The life cycle assessment was done in 4 phases: goal and scope, life cycle inventory analysis, life cycle impact assessment, and life cycle interpretation. The goal and scope of the life cycle assessment was to assess the environmental impact of cement from cradle to gate. Cradle to gates is the time materials are harvested to when it is delivered to be used. Life cycle inventory analysis compiles data on the energy input and output throughout the process of creating cement within the boundaries of the goal and scope. The inputs that were considered in this process were raw materials and energy while outputs were various emissions such as carbon dioxide, carbon monoxide, etc. . During the life cycle impact assessment characterized, normalized, and sensitivity analysis were performed to find the abiotic depletion potential (ADP), global warming potential (GWP), human toxicity potential (HTP), acidification potential (AP), eutrophication potential (EP), and photochemical oxidation potential (POP) throughout the production process. Once the analysis is complete the results are confirmed against other studies as part of the life cycle interpretation phase.

The life cycle analysis concluded that copper slag cement is more sustainable than ordinary Portland cement. In every major life cycle impact assessment category except human toxicity potential (HTP), ordinary Portland cement had more negative impact than copper slag. Higher human toxicity potential in copper slag was caused by the electricity expended in grinding copper slag which has subpar grindability. The most significant discrepancy was in the category of abiotic depletion potential (ADP) at a 46.5% difference. ADP is the depletion of nonliving organisms such as fossil fuels. Processing copper slag requires less raw materials and coal, so it is intuitive for copper slag cement to have lower impact on ADP. Overall, the total environmental impact of Portland cement was 13.95% higher than copper slag cement showing the positive impact of using copper slag aggregate.

== Mechanical properties of copper slag aggregate ==
In 2015 the Department of Civil Engineering at the Parisutham Institute of Technology and Science performed a study on the behavior of copper slag aggregate. The goal of the study was to test the viability of copper slag as an aggregate. To observe how applicable copper slag could be in the construction industry, different ratios of copper slag and sand mixes in concrete were assessed to understand the effects of copper slag on concrete. Properties such as compressive strength, tensile strength, slump, and workability were examined.

The effect copper slag has on concrete compressive strength was found by performing compressive strength test on various 7- and 28-day concrete mixes. The ratio of copper slag to sand in each mix varied by 20% increments from 0% to 100%. With each mix having a unique amount of copper in it the effects of copper slag on concrete are observable. Results from the compressive strength test found that compressive strength increased as the amount of copper slag in a mix increased. In a 28-day mix with 0% copper slag aggregate had a capacity of 35.66 MPa whereas the mix with 100% copper slag had a capacity of 48.76 MPa.

Copper slag aggregate was also tested under the splitting tensile strength test to understand how it affects the tension of concrete. The parameters of the test were the same as the compression test with 7- and 28-day mixes having varying amounts of copper slag aggregates in 20% increments. Copper slag proved to increase tensile strength as the mixes with more copper slag had high capacities. A 28-day mix with 0% copper slag aggregate had a capacity of 4.75 MPa while a mix with 100% copper slag had a capacity of 8.64 MPa. In both tests the slump of the concrete was also observed. Slump is a measurement of the consistency of concrete before it sets with a higher slump being more fluid. Like the strength tests results, the slump increased with higher ratios of copper slag. The mix 0% copper slag had a slump of 25mm while the mix with 100% copper slag had 82mm. These results can be due to the low water absorption of copper slag (0.16%) compared to sand (1.25%).

Based on strength, copper slag aggregate provides a great alternative to sand. For maximum strength a 100% replacement of copper slag for sand is ideal. However, copper slag has lower water absorption and creates higher slump which causes bleeding in concrete. Bleeding is the process in which water from concrete is pushed upward due settlements of heavy particles in concrete mix. Due to this problem, the researchers recommend a usage of up to 60% copper slag to sand ratio.

== Applications ==
=== Grit blasting ===
Copper slag is mainly used for surface blast-cleaning. Abrasive blasting is used to clean and shape the surface of metal, stone, concrete and other materials. In this process, a stream of abrasive grains called grit are propelled toward the workpiece. Copper slag is just one of many different materials that may be used as abrasive grit. Rate of grit consumption, amount of dust generated, and surface finish quality are some of the variables affected by the choice of grit material.

Internationally the described media is manufactured in compliance with ISO 11126-3

The blasting media manufactured from copper slag brings less harm to people and environment than sand. The product meets the most rigid health and ecological standards.

=== Construction ===
Copper slag can be used in concrete production as a partial replacement for sand. Copper slag is used as a building material, formed into blocks. Such use was common in areas where smelting was done, including St Helens and Cornwall in England. In Sweden (Skellefteå region) fumed and settled granulated copper slag from the Boliden copper smelter is used as road-construction material. The granulated slag (<3 mm size fraction) has both insulating and drainage properties which are usable to avoid ground frost in winter which in turn prevents pavement cracks. The usage of this slag reduces the usage of primary materials as well as reduces the construction depth which in turn reduces energy demand in building. Due to the same reasons the granulated slag is usable as a filler and insulating material in house foundations in a cold climate. Numerous houses in the same region are built with a slag insulated foundation.

=== Gamma-ray shielding ===
Heavy weight concrete has superior shielding capability as it increases the density of mixes. In fact, using high-density materials as aggregate phase plays an important role in enhancing attenuation capability of concrete since aggregates constitute about three quarters of concrete's volume. The high atomic number in such materials promotes absorption and slows down the neutrons of gamma rays which in turn reduces the penetration depth of harmful gamma rays inside the concrete. The use of heavy-weight concrete eliminates the need for thick walls which serve as architectural obstacles and limit the available space. In this study concrete mixes were prepared with different percentages of GGBFS and CS as a partial replacement of cement and natural fine aggregate, respectively. Concrete mixes were subjected to 137Cs and 60Co point sources. The radiation shielding capability of concrete mixes was evaluated in terms of linear attenuation coefficient (μ) and half-value layer (HVL). The use of GGBFS as a partial replacement of cement generally resulted in a minor increase in the linear attenuation coefficient of mixes. On the other hand, the effect of CS on the linear attenuation coefficient was more pronounced as the linear attenuation coefficient increased by 31% with the use of heavyweight CS aggregates. It was confirmed from the test results that partially replacing natural sand with CS further reduced the half-value layer (HVL) thickness. Results showed that concrete made with 60% GGBFS and 100% CS exhibit superior radiation shielding capability and satisfies the strength requirements for structural applications. Therefore, it is suitable for radiation shielding of structures such as healthcare centers.

== See also ==
- Pressure washer
- Dross
- Water jet cutter
