= Zirconia toughened alumina =

Zirconia toughened alumina is a ceramic material comprising alumina and zirconia. It is a composite ceramic material with zirconia grains in the alumina matrix.

It is also known in industry as ZTA.

Zirconia alumina (or zirconia toughened alumina), a combination of zirconium oxide and aluminum oxide, is part of a class of composite ceramics called AZ composites. Noted for their mechanical properties, AZ composites are commonly used in structural applications, as cutting tools, and in many medical applications. Additionally, AZ composites feature high strength, fracture toughness, elasticity, hardness, and wear resistance. Zirconia toughened alumina (ZTA), in particular, offers several key properties.

== Structure ==
Zirconia toughened alumina consists of zirconia particles dispersed in an alumina matrix. Its increased resistance to crack propagation is partly attributed to stress-induced transformation toughening. Under an applied load, metastable zirconia particles can transform from the tetragonal phase to the monoclinic phase. The accompanying volume expansion helps suppress crack propagation within the alumina matrix.

== Chemical and mechanical properties ==
Mechanical Properties of Zirconia Toughened Alumina
Property	Value
Chemical Formula	ZrO2-Al2O3
Density	4.1-4.38 g/cm^{3}
Hardness	1750-2100 Knoop
Elasticity	45-49 x 10^6 psi
Flexure Strength	100-145 ksi
Poisson's Ratio	0.26
Fracture Toughness	5-7 MPa m^1/2
Coefficient of Thermal Expansion	8.0-8.1 x 10^-6 1/C
Thermal Conductivity	20.0-21.0 W/mK
Shock Resistance	325 °C
Maximum Working Temperature	1650 °C
All Properties given at room temperature

== Uses ==
Recently, there have been many uses for Zirconia Toughened Alumina, including valve seals, bushing, pump components, joint implants, wire bonding capillaries, cutting tool inserts, and many more. ZTA has a diverse range of properties, giving its importance in an array of applications. In the medical industry, ZTA serves as a ceramic that can be used in joint replacement and rehabilitation. ZTA's high wear resistance helps create high performance implants. Because of ZTA's high strength and corrosion resistance, it enables the material to withstand heavy loads without succumbing to degradation; giving ZTA many uses in load bearing applications. ZTA's toughness also means that it has many uses in cutting tools. ZTA and other Alumina are often used in metal cutting applications. Certain engine components, labware, industrial crucibles, refractory tubes can be manufactured using ZTA. Also, certain abrasive applications, such as sandblasting, can also be manufactured using ZTA.
