= Buffer =

Buffer or Buffers may refer to:

== Science ==
- Buffer gas, an inert or nonflammable gas
- Buffer solution, a solution used to prevent changes in pH
- Lysis buffer, in cell biology
- Metal ion buffer
- Mineral redox buffer, in geology

== Technology and engineering ==
- Buffer (GIS), a zone around a map feature
- Buffer (optical fiber), a component of a fiber optic cable
- Buffer (rail transport), a device that cushions impacts between vehicles
- Buffer amplifier, an isolating circuit used in electronics or telecommunications
- Buffer stop, a device that keeps rail vehicles on tracks
- Buffer wheel, a device used to smooth a workpiece's surface
- Digital buffer, an electronic circuit used to isolate the input from the output
- Floor buffer, an appliance used to polish hard floors
- Optical buffer, a device that stores optically transmitted data
- Recoil buffer, a firearm component
- Seismic buffers, protect structures against the effects of earthquakes

== Computing ==
- Data buffer, memory used temporarily to store output or input data while it is transferred.
- Framebuffer, a type of data buffer for use in graphical display
- Memory buffer register, the connection between a processor (CPU) and memory (RAM)

== People ==
- Bruce Buffer (born 1957), American sports announcer for UFC events
- Michael Buffer (born 1944), American ring announcer for boxing and wrestling events

== Other uses ==
- Buffer (navy), a colloquial title
- Buffer state, a country separating two rival or hostile powers, thought to prevent conflict between them
- Buffer zone, a region separating two areas, possibly to segregate or conjoin them
- Buffering (horse), an Australian thoroughbred
- Buffering (TV series), a British TV series
- Buffer (application), a software application for managing social network accounts

== See also ==
- Buff (disambiguation)
