= Buff =

Buff or BUFF may refer to:

== People ==
- Buff (surname), a list of people
- Buff (nickname), a list of people
- Buff Bagwell, a ring name of American professional wrestler and actor Marcus Alexander Bagwell (born 1970)
- Buff Cobb (1927–2010), Italian-born American actress and former wife of Mike Wallace
- Buff Farrow (born 1967), American tennis player

== Film festivals ==
- Boston Underground Film Festival
- British Urban Film Festival
- BUFF International Film Festival, a Swedish film festival

== Video gaming ==
- Buff (video gaming), a change to a weapon or ability that deems it more viable for game balance
- Buff (MMORPGs), a temporary beneficial status effect

== Other uses ==
- BUFF (Big Ugly Fat Fucker/Fella), a nickname of the Boeing B-52 Stratofortress bomber aircraft
- Buff (colour), a pale orange-brown colour
- Buff (turkey), a breed of domestic turkey
- Buff meat or buff, buffalo meat
- Buff, a character in Generation X
- Buffing, a metal finishing process
- Nail buffing, a cosmetic treatment
- A state of nudity – see In the buff.
- Buff leather, made of bull or elk hide
- Buff (train couplers), condition of a consist of cars.

== See also ==
- Buff coat, a garment of military clothing
- Buff Island, Antarctica
- Buff Wood, a biological Site of Special Scientific Interest in Hatley, Cambridgeshire, England
- Buffs (disambiguation)
- Buffer (disambiguation)
