= Buff (surname) =

Buff is the surname of:

- Aaron Buff (1911–1994), American chair-maker
- Charlotte Buff (1753–1828), youthful acquaintance of the German polymath Goethe, who fell in love with her
- Conrad Buff II (1886–1975), Swiss-born American co-creator of illustrated children's books
- Conrad Buff III (1926–1989), American architect, son of the above
- Conrad Buff IV (born 1948), American film editor, son of the above
- Evelyn Buff-Segal (1913–2000), née Buff, American abstract expressionist painter
- Joe Buff, American author of naval techno-thrillers
- Johnny Buff (1889–1955), American boxer
- Oliver Buff (born 1992), Swiss footballer
- Sebastian Buff (1828–1880), Swiss portrait painter
- Wade Buff, a member of the 1950s The Dream Weavers vocal group
- Xavier Buff (born 1971), French mathematician

Media related to Buff (surname) at Wikimedia Commons
