= Swiss Army knife =

Versatile folding multi-tool knife

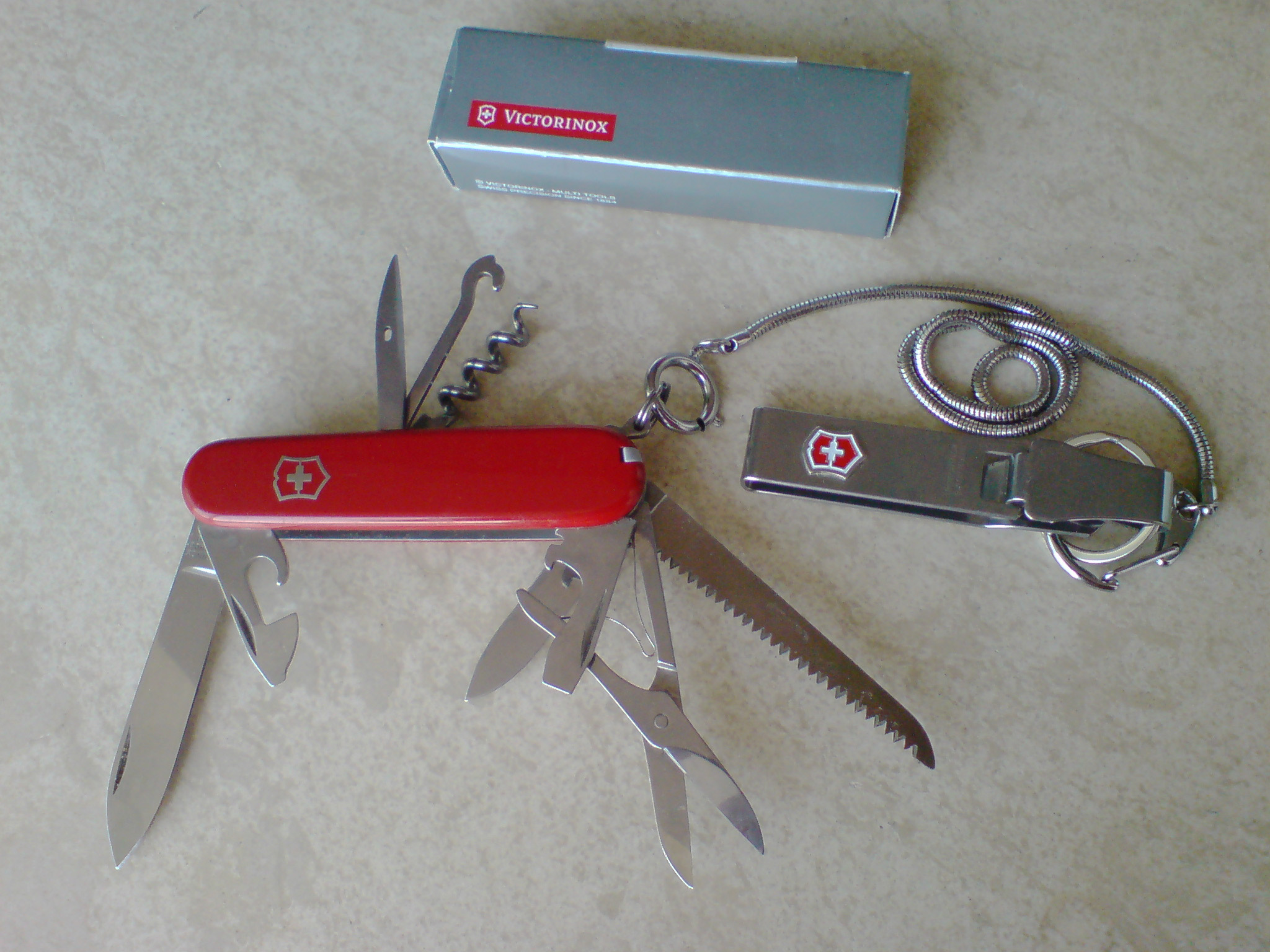
Victorinox "Huntsman" Swiss Army knife, with knife chain and belt clip

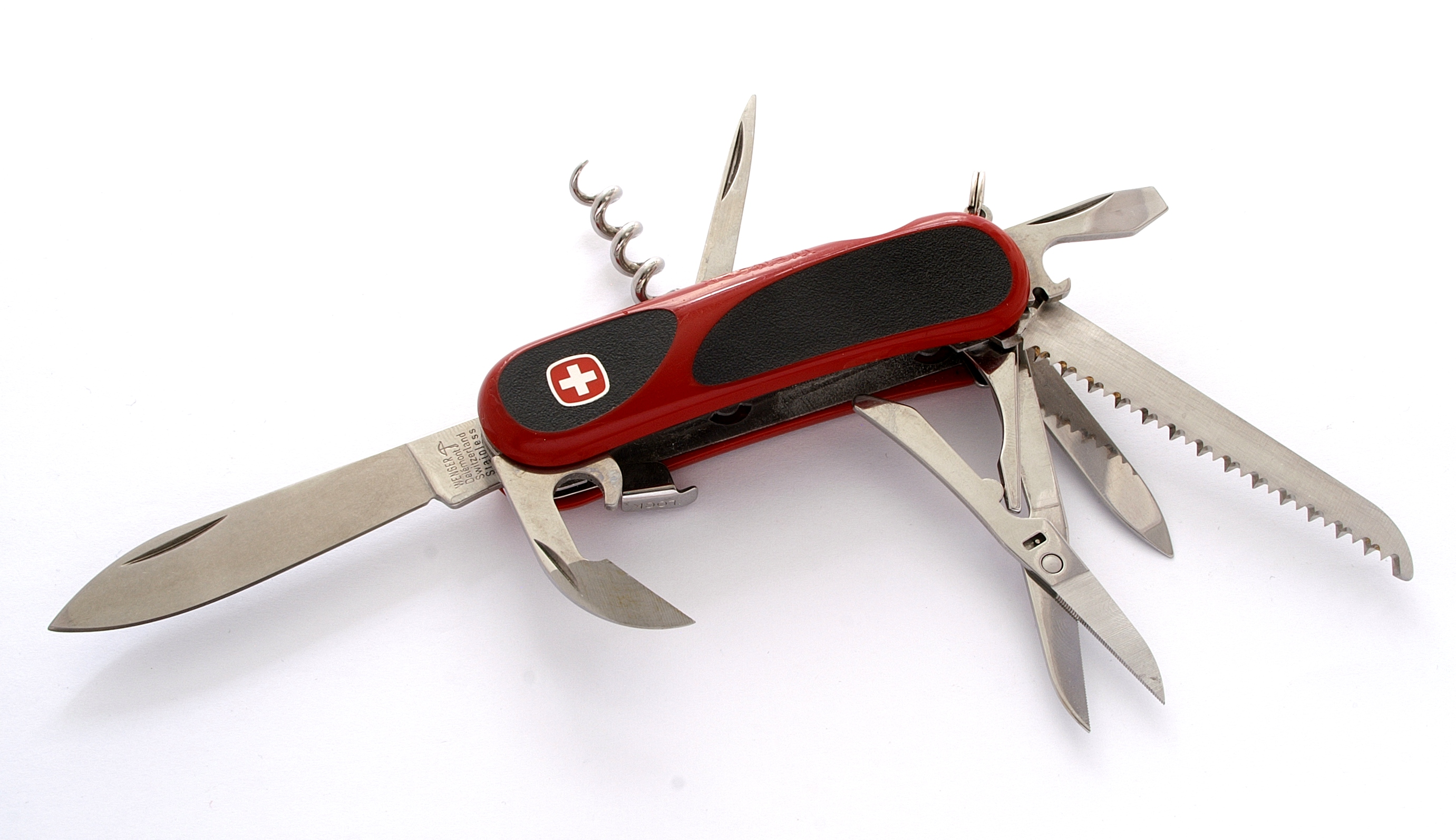
Wenger "EvoGrip S17" Swiss Army knife. Since 2013, the knives of Wenger are integrated in Victorinox.

The Swiss Army knife (German: Schweizer Taschenmesser, Sackmesser, Hegel, etc.) is a multi-tooled pocketknife made for the Swiss Army since 1890, with consumer versions made, particularly since 1945. The term "Swiss Army knife" was used by American soldiers after World War II rather than the German word "Offiziersmesser", meaning "Officer's knife". They are commonly made by Victorinox and its subsidiary Wenger.

The Swiss Army knife generally has a drop-point main blade plus screwdriver, bottle opener, can opener and awl, while commercial versions include other blades and tools, such as scissors, corkscrew, saw blade, tweezers and toothpick. The blades and tools are folded into the handle of the knife through a pivot point mechanism. The handle is traditionally a brown cellulose fibre with embossed Swiss cross, with later military issue having plastic handles with the coat of arms of Switzerland and consumer versions mainly having red plastic handles but also made in a variety of colours and materials. Consumer knives can be distinguished by their cross logos; the Victorinox logo has a cross surrounded by a shield while Wenger's has a cross surrounded by a rounded square.

The knives are an icon of Swiss culture and the design and the versatility of the knife have worldwide recognition. Until 2008, Victorinox and Wenger supplied about 50,000 knives to the Swiss military each year and manufactured many more for export, mostly to the United States. Sales declined significantly as a result of competition from other pocket multi-tools and legal restrictions on the carrying of knives, particularly on airlines.

== History ==
=== Origins ===
Multi-tool pocket knives have been made since at least the mid-19th century. In 1851, in Moby-Dick (chapter 107), Herman Melville mentions the "Sheffield contrivances, assuming the exterior – though a little swelled – of a common pocket knife; but containing, not only blades of various sizes, but also screwdrivers, cork-screws, tweezers, bradawls, pens, rulers, nail files and countersinkers."

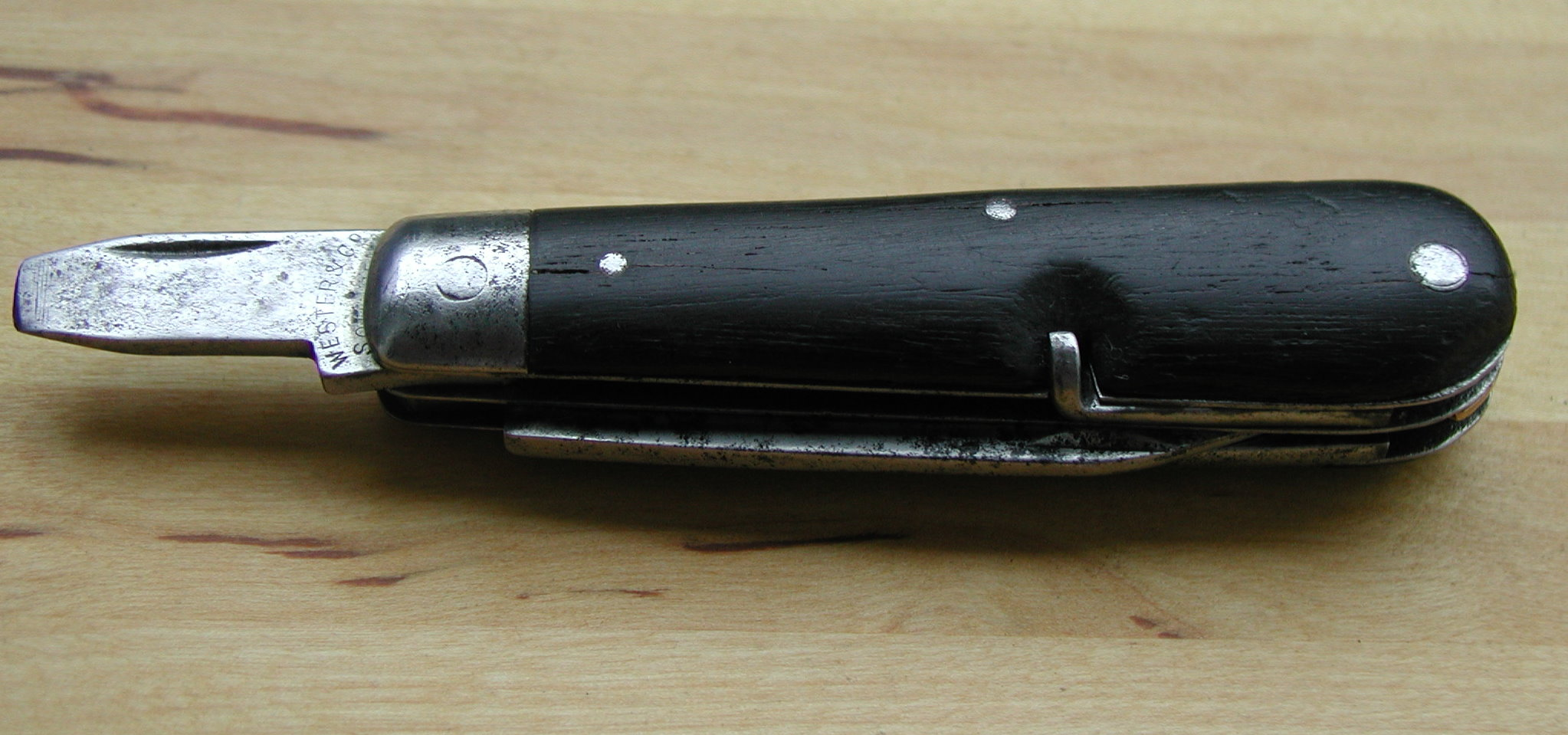
Modell 1890, the first Swiss soldier knife produced by Wester & Co. Solingen

During the late 1880s, the Swiss Army decided to purchase a new folding pocket knife for their soldiers. This knife was to be suitable for use by the army in opening canned food and for maintenance of the Swiss service rifle, the Schmidt–Rubin, which required a screwdriver for assembly and disassembly. In January 1891, the knife received the official designation Modell 1890. The knife had a blade, reamer, can opener, screwdriver, and grips made out of dark oak wood, some possibly later replaced with ebony wood. At that time, no Swiss company had the necessary production capacity, so the initial order for 15,000 knives was placed with the German knife manufacturer Wester & Co. of Solingen, Germany. These knives were delivered in October 1891.

=== Victorinox and Wenger ===
In 1891, Karl Elsener, owner of a business in Ibach, Switzerland that made surgical equipment (which later became Victorinox) set out to manufacture the knives in Switzerland. In late 1891, Elsener began production of the Modell 1890 knives, in competition with the German manufacturer. He incurred financial losses doing so, as Wester & Co was able to produce the knives at a lower cost.

In 1893, the Swiss cutlery company Paul Boéchat & Cie of Delémont in the French-speaking Canton of Jura, received its first contract from the Swiss military to produce model 1890 knives. Later, its general manager, Théodore Wenger, acquired the company and renamed it the Wenger Company. The two Swiss companies split the initial contract for provision of the knives.

Elsener was on the verge of bankruptcy when, in 1896, he developed an improved knife, intended for the use by officers, with tools attached on both sides of the handle using a special spring mechanism, allowing him to use the same spring to hold them in place. This new knife was patented on 12 June 1897, with a second, smaller cutting blade, a corkscrew, and cellulose fibre grips, under the name of Schweizer Offiziers- und Sportmesser ("Swiss officer's and sports knife"). The Swiss military did not commission the knife but it was successfully marketed internationally, restoring Elsener's company to prosperity. Wenger produced similar knives.

In 1908 the Swiss government split the contract between Victorinox and Wenger, placing half the orders with each.

In 1909, Elsener used a variation on the Swiss coat of arms to identify his knives. With slight modifications, this is still the company logo. In 1909, following the death of his mother, Elsener used her name Victoria as a brand name. In 1921 following the invention of stainless steel (acier inoxydable in French), Karl Elsener's son renamed the company to be Victorinox combining Victoria and inoxydable.

Wenger advertised as "the Genuine Swiss Army Knife" and Victorinox as "the Original Swiss Army Knife".

By the early 2000s, sales of Swiss Army knives declined dramatically as a result of competition from other pocket multi-tools and restrictions on carrying knives, especially on airlines.

On 26 April 2005, Victorinox acquired Wenger, becoming the sole supplier of knives to the military of Switzerland. Victorinox at first kept the Wenger brand intact, but on 30 January 2013, it announced that the Wenger brand of knives would be abandoned in favour of Victorinox. A press release stated that Wenger's factory in Delémont would continue to produce knives and all employees at this site will retain their jobs. They further elaborated that an assortment of items from the Wenger line-up will remain in production under the Victorinox brand name. Wenger's US headquarters would be merged with Victorinox's location in Monroe, Connecticut. Wenger's watch and licensing business will continue as a separate brand: SwissGear.

== Swiss government legal proceedings over trademark ==
Victorinox registered the words "Swiss Army" and "Swiss Military" as trademarks in the United States (US). The Swiss government agency, Armasuisse took legal action against Victorinox in October 2018. After an initial hearing, Victorinox agreed to cede the US registration in of the term "Swiss military" to Armasuisse in return for an exclusive licence to market perfumes under the same name.

== Features ==
=== Components ===
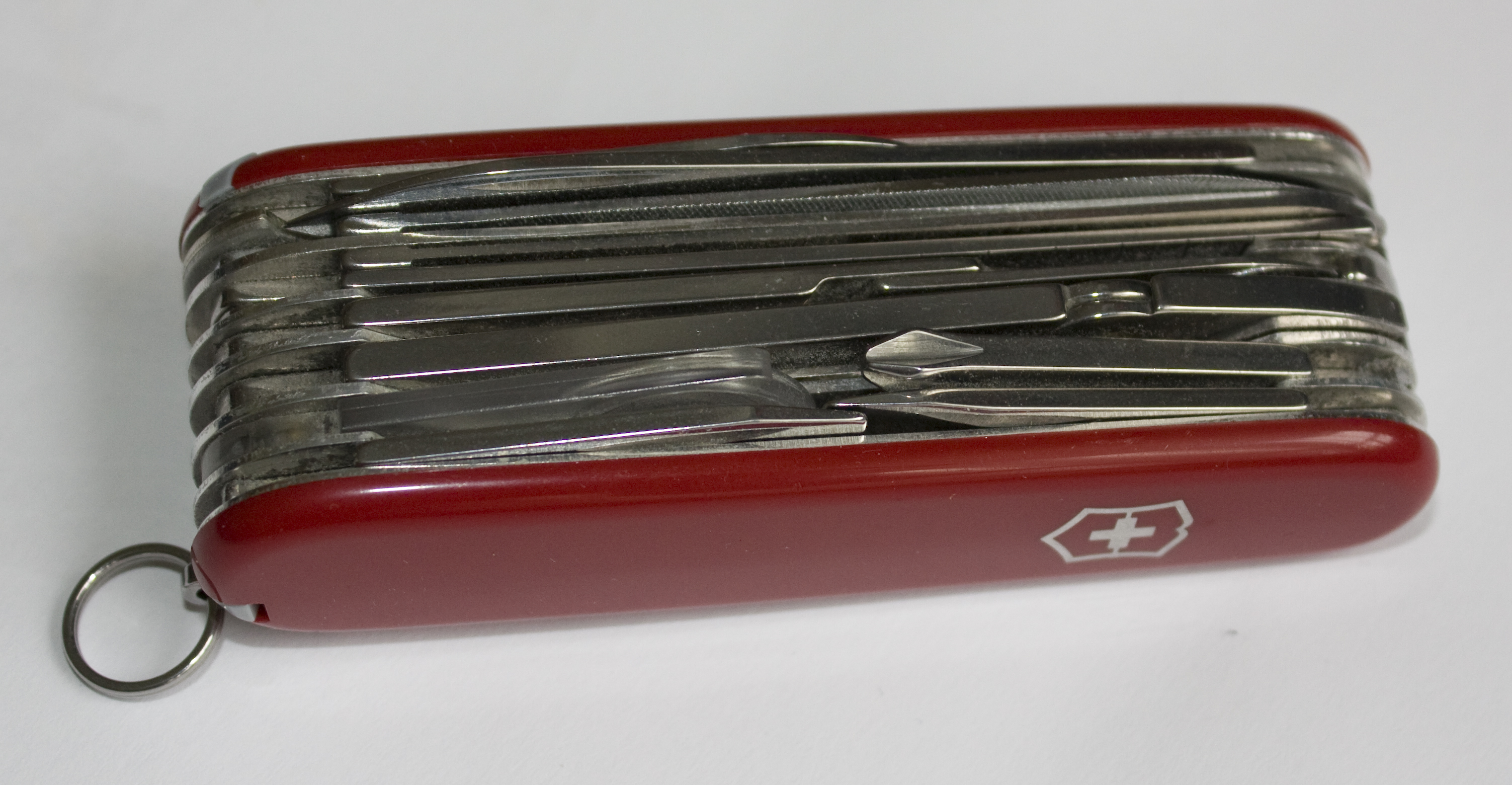
The Victorinox SwissChamp consists of eight layers with 33 functions and weighs 185 g.

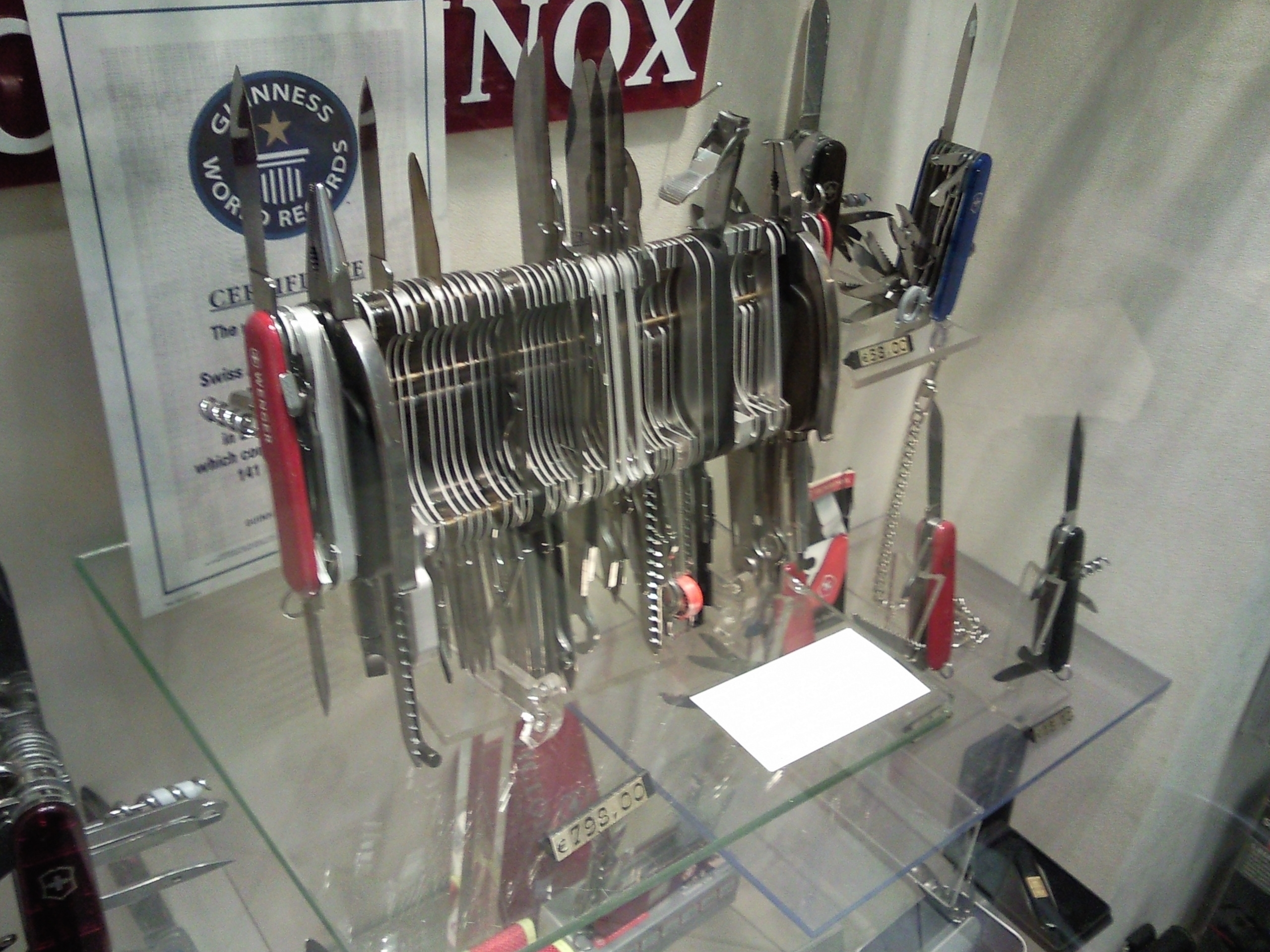
Wenger Giant

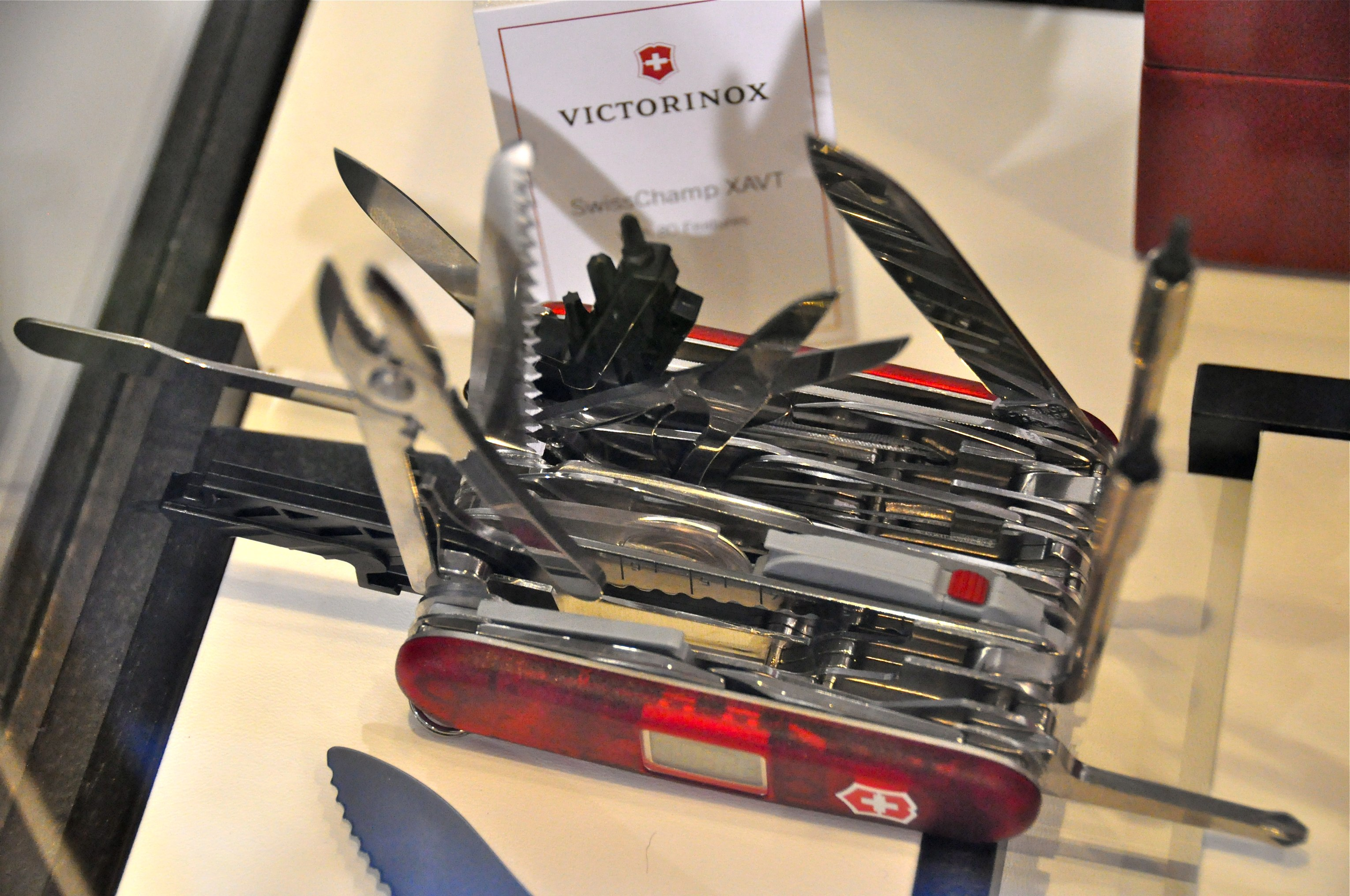
Victorinox SwissChamp XAVT

There are various models of the Swiss Army knife with different tool combinations.

Though Victorinox does not provide custom knives, they have produced many different variations to suit individual users, with the Wenger company producing even more model variations.

==== Common main layer tools ====
- Large blade
  - With 'VICTORINOX SWISS MADE' tang stamp on Victorinox blades since 2005
- Small blade
- Nail file
- Scissors
  - Sharpened to a 65° angle
- Wood saw
- Metal file or metal saw with nail file
- Magnifying glass
- Phillips screwdriver
- Fish scaler / hook disgorger / ruler in cm and inches
- Pliers / wire cutter / wire crimper
- Can opener / 3 mm slot screwdriver
- Bottle opener / 6 mm slot screwdriver with wire stripper

==== Other main layer tools ====
- LED light
- USB flash drive
- Hoof cleaner
- Shackle opener / marlinspike
- Electrician's blade / wire scraper
- Pruning blade
- Pharmaceutical spatula (cuticle pusher)
- Cyber Tool (bit driver)
- Combination tool containing cap opener / can opener / 5 mm slot screwdriver with wire stripper

==== Back layer tools ====
- Corkscrew or Phillips driver
- Reamer
- Multipurpose hook with nail file
- 2mm slotted screwdriver
- Chisel
- Mini screwdriver (screws within the corkscrew)
- Keyring

==== Scale tools ====
- Tweezers
- Toothpick
- Pressurised ballpoint pen (with a retractable version on smaller models, which can be used to set DIP switches)
- Stainless steel pin
- Digital clock / alarm / timer / altimeter / thermometer / barometer

Three Victorinox Swiss Army knife models had a butane lighter: the SwissFlame, the CampFlame and the SwissChamp XXLT, first introduced in 2002 and discontinued in 2005. The models were never sold in the United States due to lack of safety features. They used a standard piezoelectric ignition system for easy ignition, with adjustable flame; they were designed for operation at altitudes up to 1,500 metres (4,900 ft) above sea level and continuous operation of 10 minutes.

In January 2010, Victorinox announced the Presentation Master models, released in April 2010. The technological tools included a laser pointer, and detachable flash drive with fingerprint reader. Victorinox now sells an updated version called the Slim Jetsetter, with "a premium software package that provides ultra secure data encryption, automatic backup functionality, secure web surfing capabilities, file and email synchronization between the drive and multiple computers, Bluetooth pairing and much more. On the hardware side of things, biometric fingerprint technology, laser pointers, LED lights, Bluetooth remote control and of course, the original implements – blade, scissors, nail file, screwdriver, key ring and ballpoint pen are standard. **Not every feature is available on every model within the collection."

In 2006, Wenger produced a knife called "The Giant" that included every implement the company ever made, with 87 tools and 141 different functions. It was recognized by Guinness World Records as the world's most multifunctional penknife. It retails for about €798 or $US1000, though some vendors charge much higher prices.

In the same year, Victorinox released the SwissChamp XAVT, consisting of 118 parts and 80 functions with a retail price of $425. The Guinness Book of Records recognizes a unique 314-blade Swiss Army-style knife made in 1991 by Master Cutler Hans Meister as the world's largest penknife, weighing 11 pounds (5.0 kg).

=== Materials ===
Rivets and flanged bushings made from brass hold together all machined steel parts and other tools, separators and the scales. The rivets are made by cutting and pointing appropriately sized bars of solid brass.

The separators between the tools have been made from aluminium alloy since 1951. This makes the knives lighter. Previously these separating layers were made of nickel-silver.

The martensitic stainless steel alloy used for the cutting blades is optimized for high toughness and corrosion resistance and has a composition of 15% chromium, 0.60% silicon, 0.52% carbon, 0.50% molybdenum, and 0.45% manganese and is designated X55CrMo14 or DIN 1.4110 according to Victorinox. After a hardening process at 1040 °C and annealing at 160 °C the blades achieve an average hardness of 56 HRC. This steel hardness is suitable for practical use and easy resharpening, but less than achieved in stainless steel alloys used for blades optimized for high wear resistance. According to Victorinox the martensitic stainless steel alloy used for the other parts is X39Cr13 (aka DIN 1.4031, AISI/ASTM 420) and for the springs X20Cr13 (aka DIN 1.4021, but still within AISI/ASTM 420).

The steel used for the wood saws, scissors and nail files has a steel hardness of HRC 53, the screwdrivers, tin openers and awls have a hardness of HRC 52, and the corkscrew and springs have a hardness of HRC 49.

The metal saws and files, in addition to the special case hardening, are also subjected to a hard chromium plating process so that iron and steel can also be filed and cut.

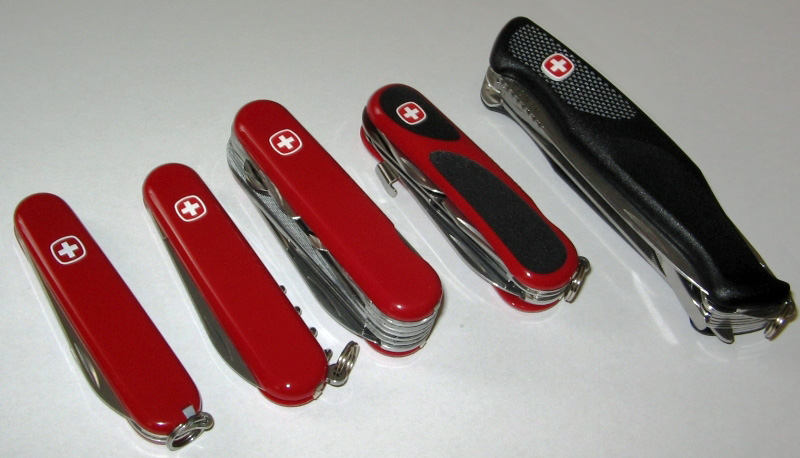
Various sized and scaled models produced by Wenger

Although red Cellulose Acetate Butyrate (CAB) (generally known trade names are Cellidor, Tenite and Tenex) scaled Swiss Army knives are most common, there are many colors and alternative materials like more resilient nylon and aluminum for the scales available. Many textures, colors and shapes now appear in the lineup. Since 2006 the scales on some knife models can have textured rubber non-slip inlays incorporated, intended for sufficient grip with moist or wet hands. The rubber also provides some impact protection for such edged scales. Modifications have been made, including professionally produced custom models combining novel materials, colors, finishes and occasionally new tools such as firesteels or tool 'blades' mounting replaceable surgical scalpel blades to replacement of standard scales (handles) with new versions in natural materials such as buffalo horn. In addition to 'limited edition' productions runs, numerous examples from basic to professional-level customizations of standard knives—such as retrofitting pocket clips, one-off scales created using 3D printing techniques, decoration using anodization and new scale materials—can be found by searching for "SAK mods".

== Mechanism ==
=== Locking mechanisms ===
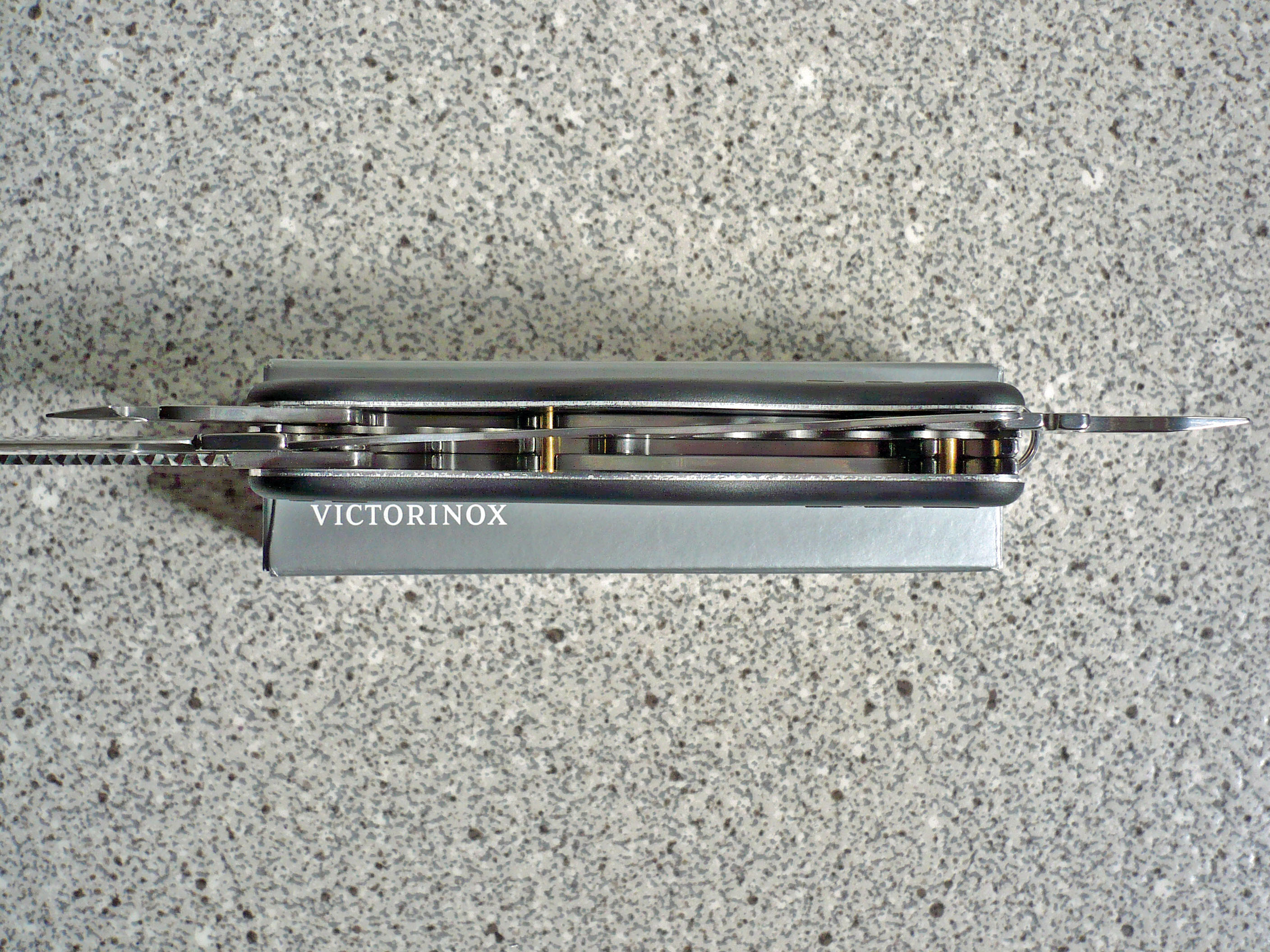
Dual liner lock system as used in the Soldatenmesser 08 and various other Victorinox 111 mm models

Some Swiss Army knives have locking blades to prevent accidental closure.

Wenger was the first to offer a "PackLock" for the main blade on several of their standard 85mm models.

Several large Wenger and Victorinox models have a locking blade secured by a slide lock that is operated with an unlocking-button integrated in the scales.

Some Victorinox 111 mm series knives have a double liner lock that secures the cutting blade and large slotted screwdriver/cap opener/wire stripper combination tool designed towards prying.

=== Assembly ===
During assembly, all components are placed on several brass rivets.

The first components are generally an aluminium separator and a flat steel spring. Once a layer of tools is installed, another separator and spring are placed for the next layer of tools.

This process is repeated until all the desired tool layers and the finishing separator are installed. Once the knife is built, the metal parts are fastened by adding brass flanged bushings to the rivets. The excess length of the rivets is then cut off to make them flush with the bushings. Finally, the remaining length of the rivets is flattened into the flanged bushings.

After the assembly of the metal parts, the blades on smaller knives are sharpened to a 15° angle, resulting in a 30° V-shaped steel cutting edge. From 91 mm (3.6 in) sized knives the blades are sharpened to a 20° angle, resulting in a 40° V-shaped steel cutting edge. Chisel ground blades are sharpened to a 24° angle, resulting in a 24° asymmetric-shaped steel cutting edge where only one side is ground and the other is deburred and remains flat. The blades are then checked with a laser reflecting goniometer to verify the angle of the cutting edges.

Finally, scales are applied. Slightly undersized holes incorporated into the inner surface enclose the bushings, which have truncated cone cross-section and are slightly undercut, forming a one-way interference fit when pressed into the generally softer and more elastic scale material. The result is a tight adhesive-free connection that nonetheless permits new identical-pattern scales to be quickly and easily applied.

== Sizes ==
Victorinox models are available in 58 mm (2.3 in), 74 mm (2.9 in), 84 mm (3.3 in), 91 mm (3.6 in), 93 mm (3.7 in), 100 mm (3.9 in), 108 mm (4.3 in) and 111 mm (4.4 in) lengths when closed.

The thickness of the knives varies depending on the number of tool layers included. The 91 mm (3.6 in) models offer the most variety in tool configurations in the Victorinox model line with as many as 15 layers.

Wenger models are available in 65 mm (2.6 in), 75 mm (3.0 in), 85 mm (3.3 in) 93 mm (3.7 in), 100 mm (3.9 in), 120 mm (4.7 in) and 130 mm (5.1 in) lengths when closed.

Thickness varies depending on the number of tool layers included. The 85 mm (3.3 in) models offer the most variety in tool configurations in the Wenger model line, with as many as 10 layers.

== Adoption ==
=== Swiss Armed Forces ===
Since the first issue as personal equipment in 1891 the Soldatenmesser (Soldier Knives) issued by the Swiss Armed Forces have been revised several times.

There have been five different main Modelle (models).

Their model numbers refer to the year of introduction in the military supply chain. Several main models have been revised over time and therefore exist in different Ausführungen (executions), also denoted by the year of introduction.

The issued models of the Swiss Armed Forces are:

- Modell 1890
  - Modell 1890 Ausführung 1901
- Modell 1908
- Modell 1951
  - Modell 1951 Ausführung 1954
  - Modell 1951 Ausführung 1957
- Modell 1961
  - Modell 1961 Ausführung 1965
  - Modell 1961 Ausführung 1978
  - Modell 1961 Ausführung 1994
- Soldatenmesser 08 (Soldier Knife 08)

Soldier Knives are issued to every recruit or member of the Swiss Armed Forces and the knives issued to officers have never differed from those issued to non-commissioned officers and privates. A model incorporating a corkscrew and scissors was produced as an officer's tool, but was deemed not "essential for survival". Officers were free to purchase it individually on their own account.

==== Soldier knife model 1890 ====
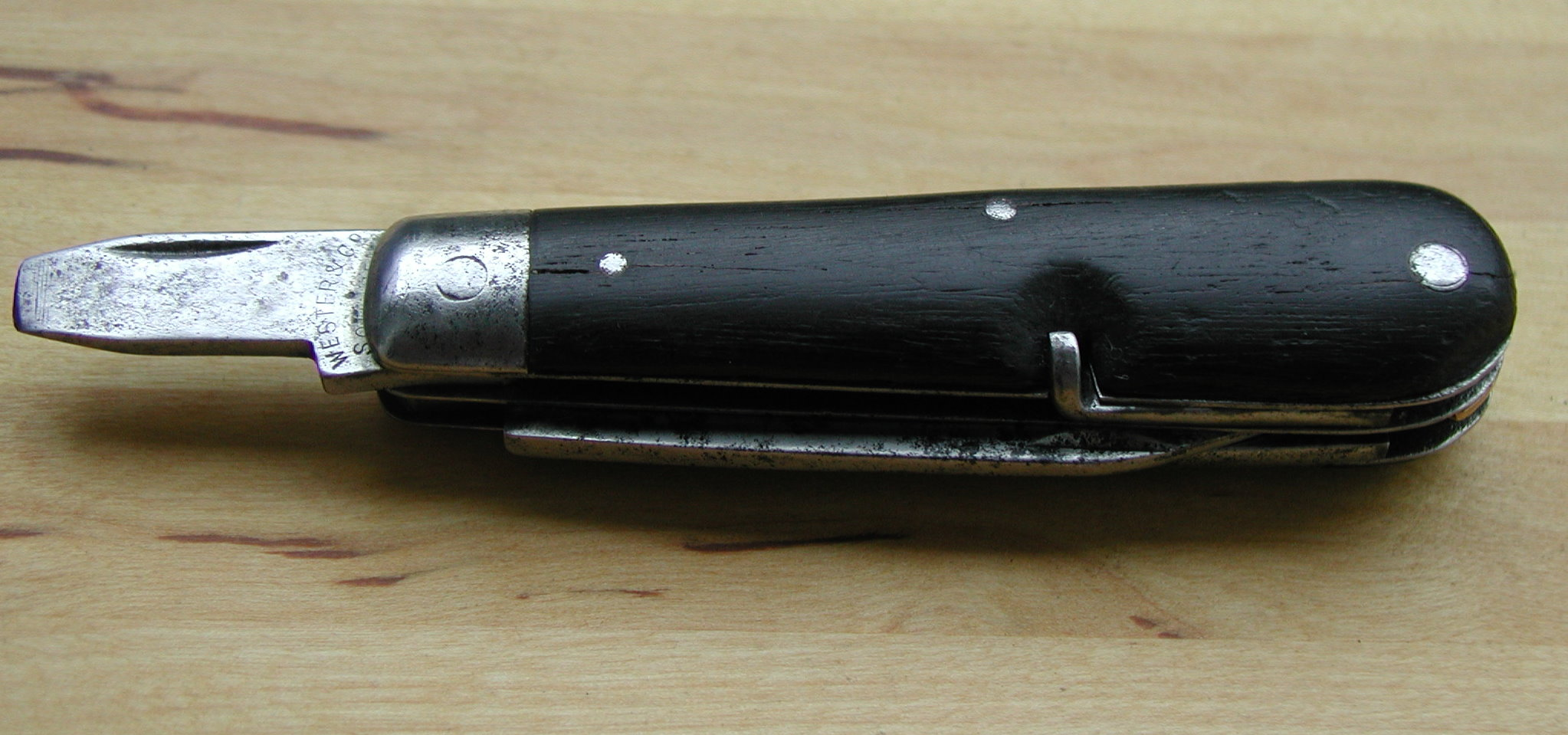
Modell 1890

The Soldier Knife model 1890 had a spear point blade, reamer, can-opener, screwdriver and grips made out of oak wood scales (handles) that were treated with rapeseed oil for greater toughness and water-repellency, which made them black in color.

The wooden grips of the Modell 1890 tended to crack and chip so in 1901 these were changed to a hard reddish-brown fiber similar in appearance to wood.

The knife was 100 mm (3.9 in) long, 20.5 mm (0.81 in) thick and weighed 144 g (5.1 oz).

==== Soldier knife model 1908 ====
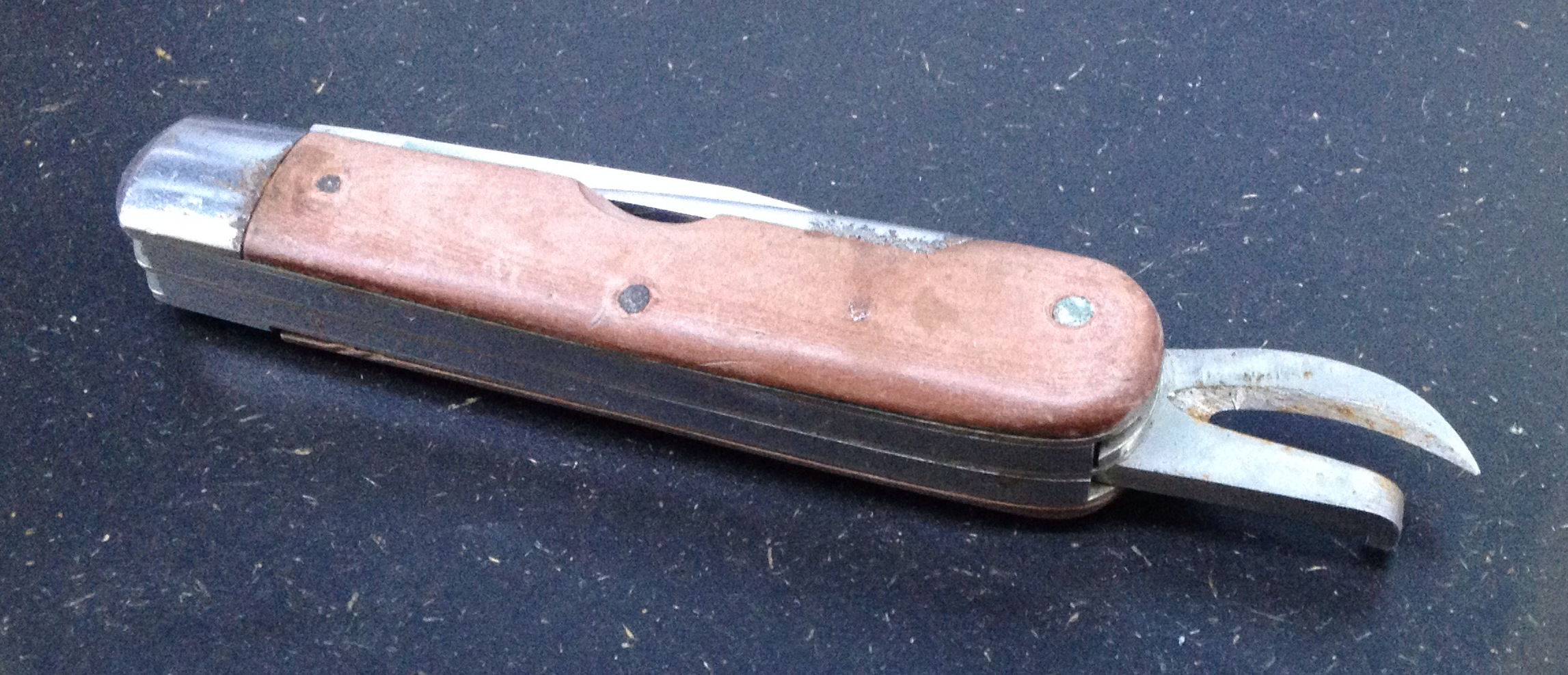
Modell 1908, issued from 1908 to 1951

The Soldier Knife model 1908 had a clip point blade rather than the 1890s spear point blade, still with the fiber scales, carbon steel tools, nickel-silver bolster, liners, and divider.

The knife was 100 mm (3.9 in) long, 16.5 mm (0.65 in) thick and weighed 125 g (4.4 oz). The contract with the Swiss Army split production equally between the Victorinox and Wenger companies.

==== Soldier knife model 1951 ====
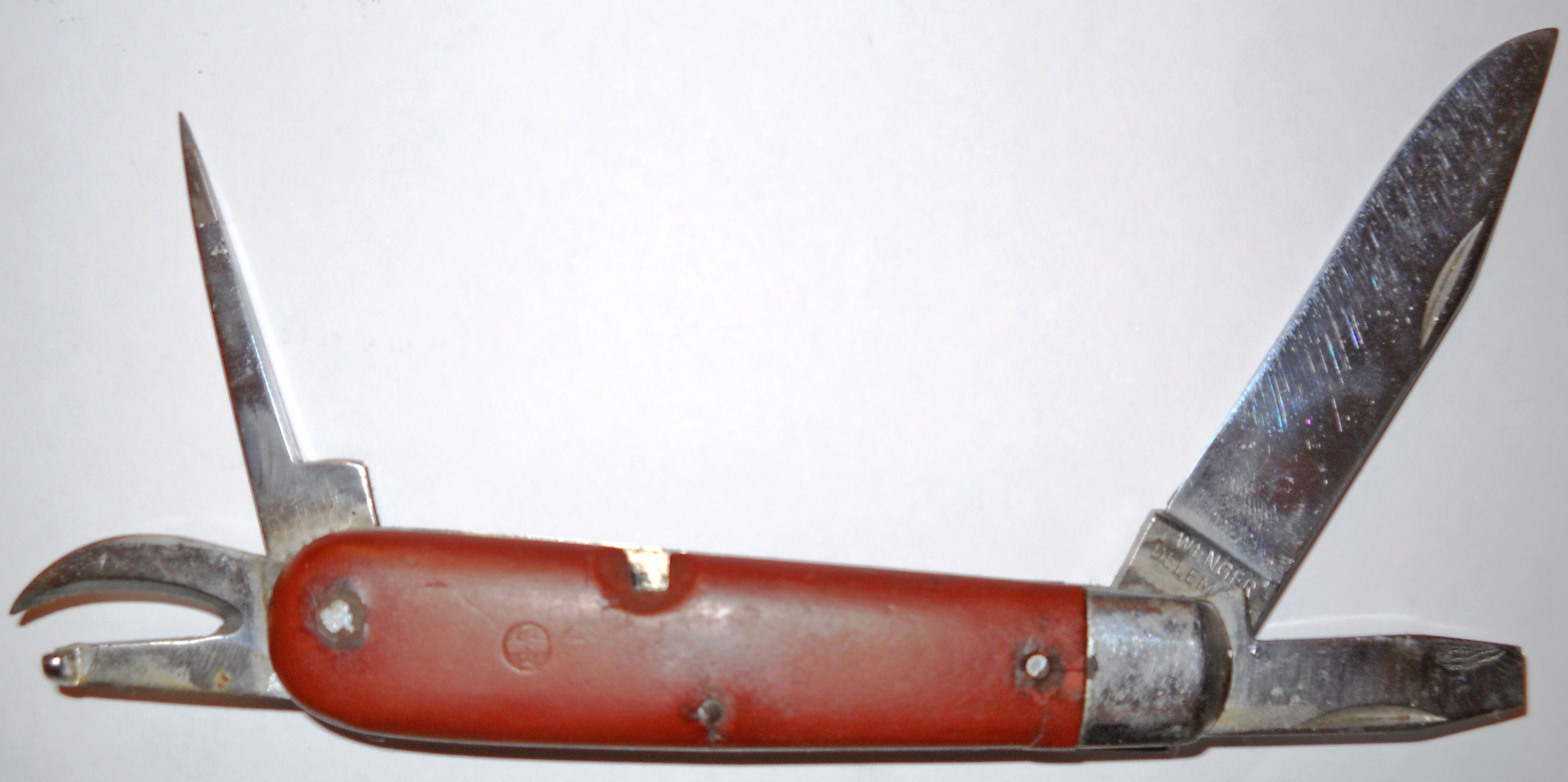
Modell 1951, issued from 1951 to 1961

The soldier Knife model 1951 had fiber scales, nickel-silver bolsters, liners, and divider, and a spear point blade.

This was the first Swiss Armed Forces issue model where the tools were made of stainless steel. The screwdriver now had a scraper arc on one edge. The knife was 93 mm (3.7 in) long, 13.5 mm (0.53 in) thick and weighed 90 g (3.2 oz).

==== Soldier knife model 1961 ====
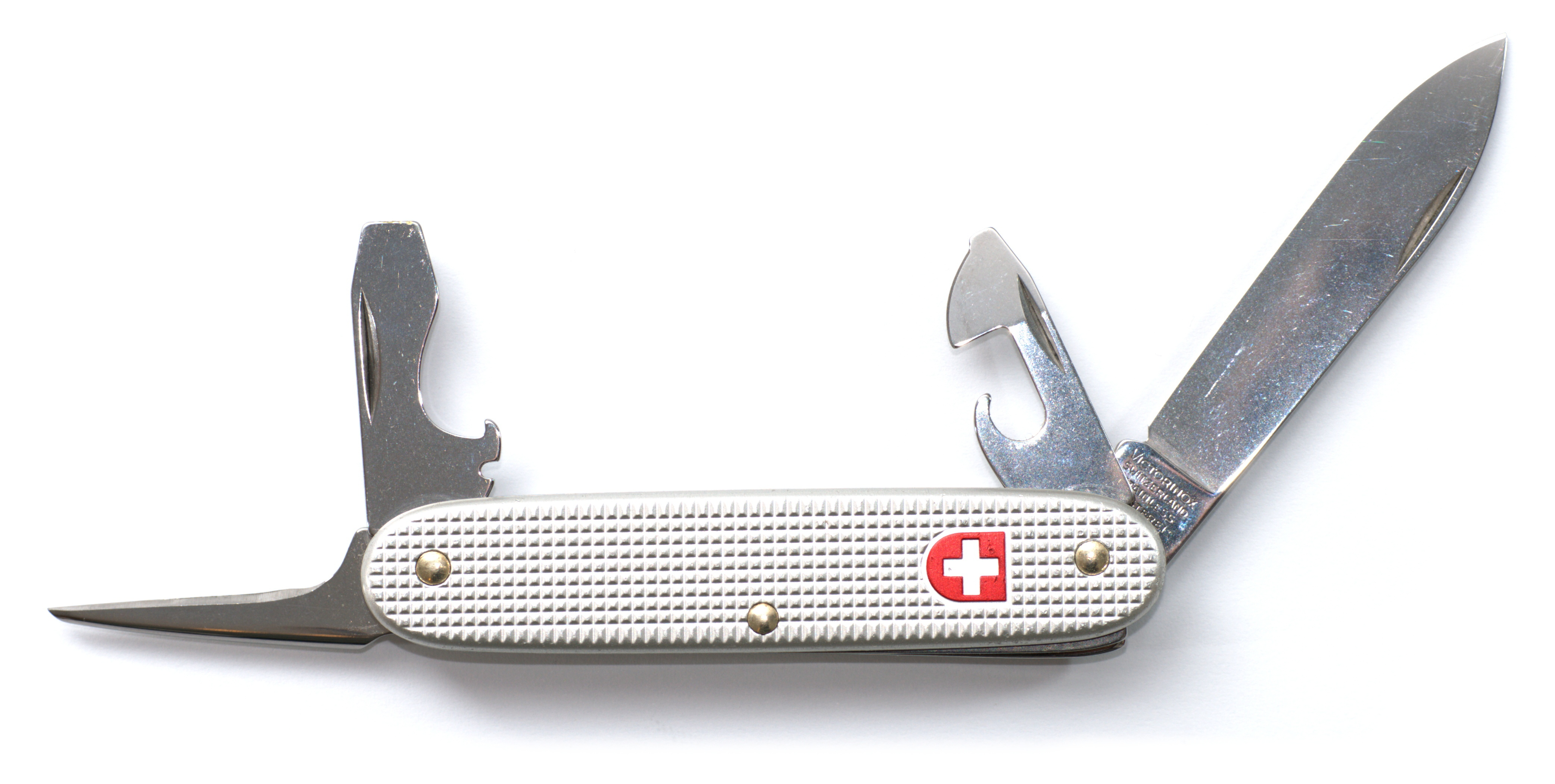
Modell 1961 Ausführung 1994, issued from 1994 to 2008

The Soldier Knife model 1961 has a 93 mm (3.7 in) long knurled "alox" (anodized aluminum) handle with the Swiss crest, a drop point blade, a reamer, a blade combining bottle opener, screwdriver, and wire stripper, and a combined can-opener and small screwdriver. The knife was 12 mm (0.47 in) thick and weighed 72 g (2.5 oz)

The 1961 model also contains a brass spacer, which allows the knife, with the screwdriver and the reamer extended simultaneously, to be used to assemble the SIG 550 and SIG 510 assault rifles: the knife serves as a restraint to the firing pin during assembly of the Lock.

The Soldier Knife model 1961 was manufactured only by Victorinox and Wenger and was the first issued knife bearing the Swiss Coat of Arms on the handle.

==== Soldier knife 08 ====
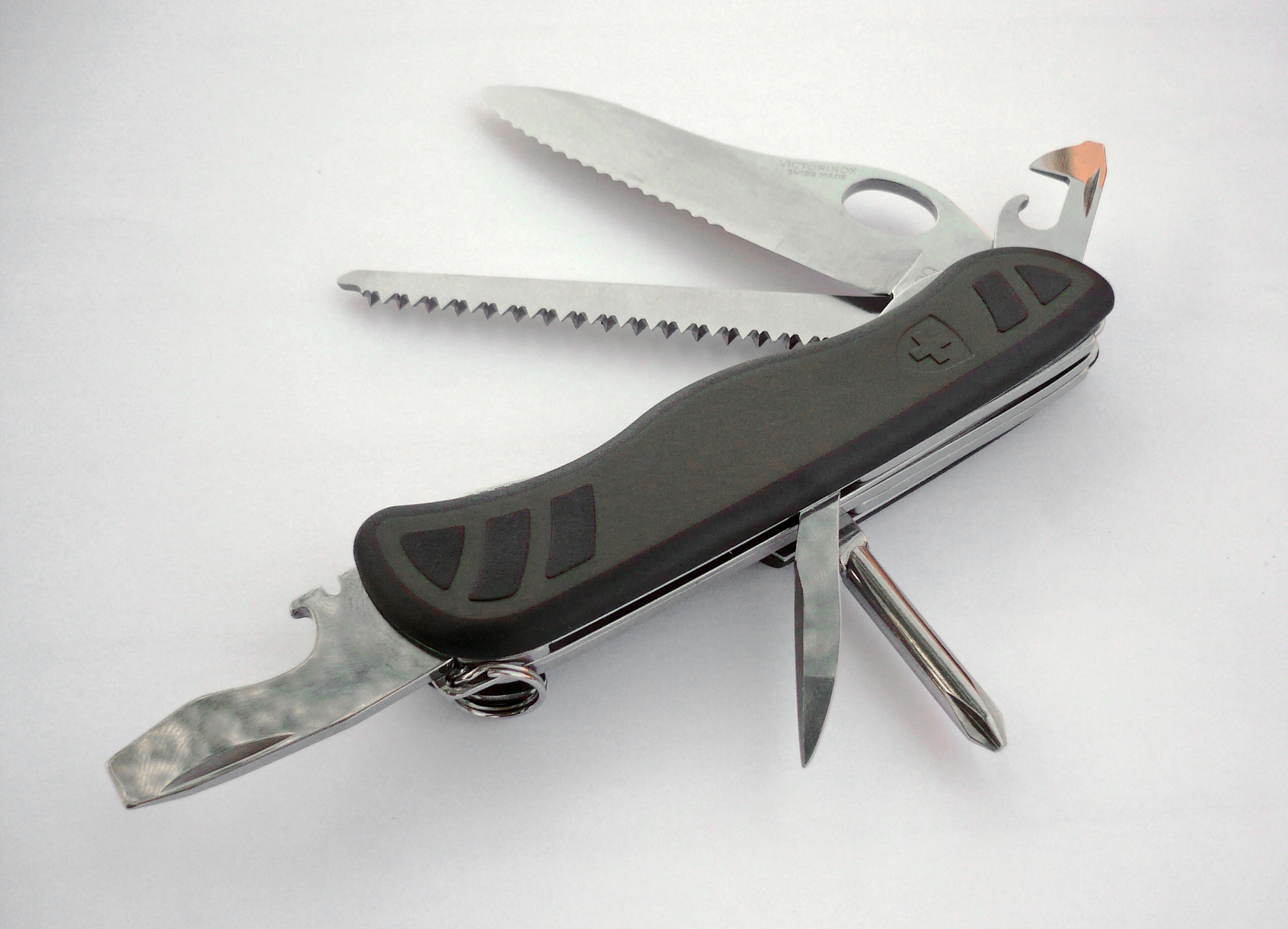
Soldatenmesser 08, the knife issued to the Swiss Armed Forces since 2008

In 2007 the Swiss Government made a request for new updated soldier knives for the Swiss military for distribution in late 2008. The evaluation phase of the new soldier knife began in February 2008, when Armasuisse issued an invitation to tender. A total of seven suppliers from Switzerland and other countries were invited to participate in the evaluation process. Functional models submitted by suppliers underwent practical testing by military personnel in July 2008, while laboratory tests were used to assess compliance with technical requirements. A cost-benefit analysis was conducted and the model with the best price/performance ratio was awarded the contract. The order for 75,000 soldier knives plus cases was worth SFr 1.38 million. This equates to a purchase price of SFr 18.40, €12.12, £11.13 in October 2009 per knife plus case.

Victorinox won the contest with a knife based on the One-Hand German Army Knife as issued by the German Bundeswehr and released in the civilian model lineup with the addition of a toothpick and tweezers stored in the nylon grip scales (side cover plates) as the One-Hand Trekker/Trailmaster model. Mass production of the new Soldatenmesser 08 (Soldier Knife 08) for the Swiss Armed Forces was started in December 2008, and issued with the first basic training sessions of 2009.

The Soldier Knife 08 has an 111 mm (4.4 in) long ergonomic dual density handle with TPU rubbery thermoplastic elastomer non-slip inlays incorporated in the green Polyamide 6 grip shells and a double liner locking system, one-hand 86 mm (3.4 in) long locking partly wavy serrated chisel ground (optimized for right-handed use) drop point blade sharpened to a 24° angle, wood saw, can opener with small 3 mm (0.12 in) slotted screwdriver, locking bottle opener with large 7 mm (0.28 in) slotted screwdriver and wire stripper/bender, reamer sharpened to a 48° angle, Phillips (PH2) screwdriver and 12 mm (0.47 in) diameter split keyring. The Soldier Knife 08 width is 34.5 mm (1.36 in), thickness is 18 mm (0.71 in), overall length opened is 197 mm (7.8 in) and it weighs 131 g (4.6 oz). The Soldier Knife 08 was not manufactured by Wenger.

=== Other militaries ===
The armed forces of more than 20 different nations have issued or approved the use of various versions of Swiss army knives made by Victorinox, among them the forces of Germany, France, the Netherlands, Norway, Malaysia and the United States (NSN 1095-01-653-1166 Knife, Combat).

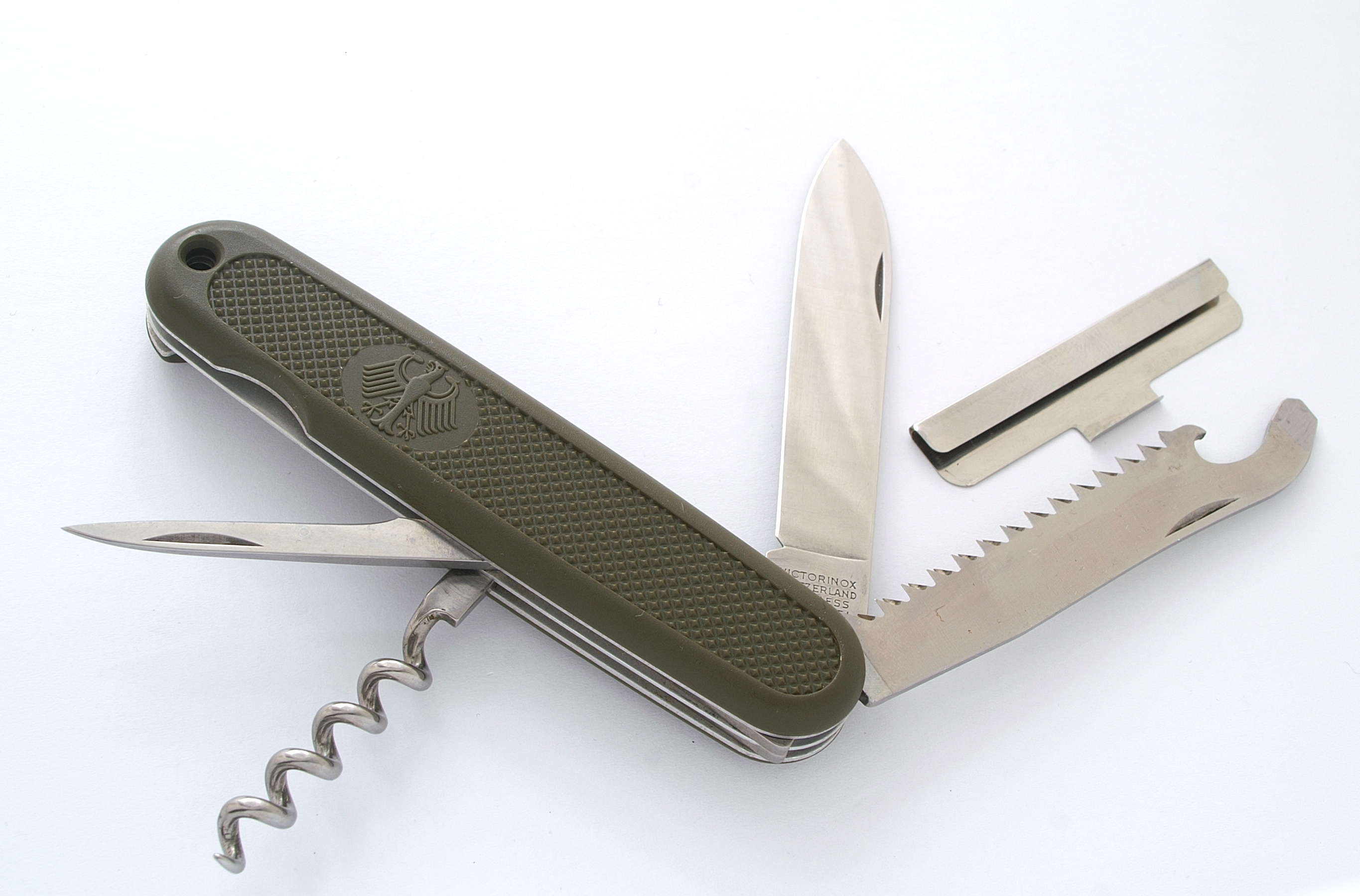
West German Army knife, 1985

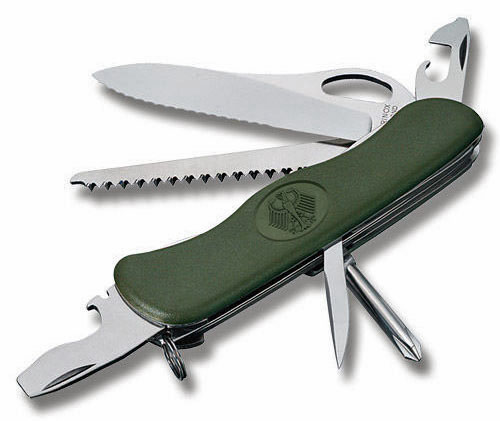
One-Hand German Army Knife, 2003

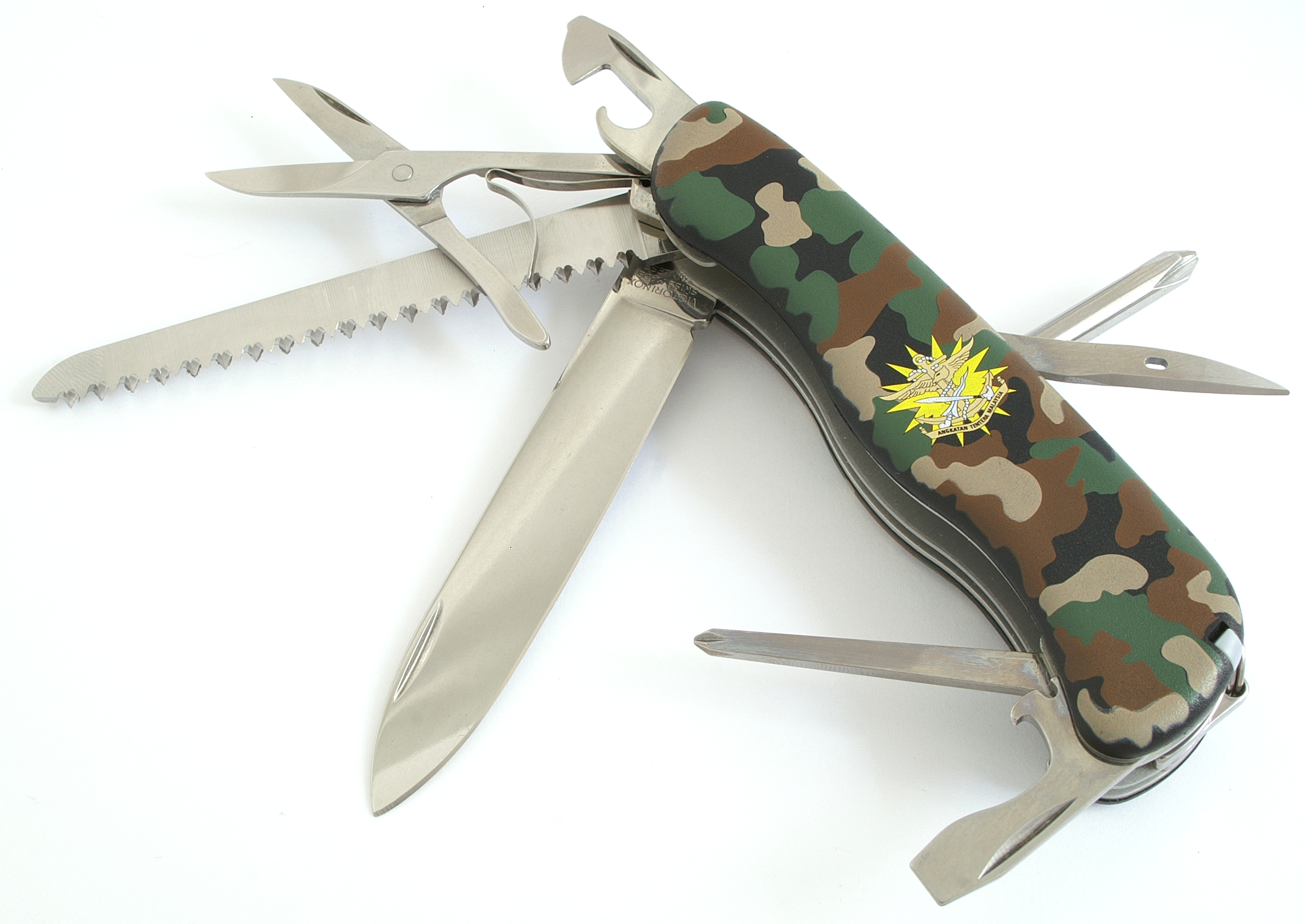
Malaysian Army knife

=== Space program ===
The Swiss Army knife has been present in space missions carried out by NASA since the late 1970s.

In 1978, NASA sent a letter of confirmation to Victorinox regarding a purchase of 50 knives known as the Master Craftsman model.

In 1985, Edward M. Payton, brother of astronaut Gary E. Payton, sent a letter to Victorinox, asking about getting a Master Craftsman knife after seeing the one his brother used in space.

There are other stories of repairs conducted in space using a Swiss Army knife.

== Cultural impact ==
=== Trademarking ===
The term "Swiss Army" currently is a registered trademark owned by Victorinox AG and its subsidiary, Wenger SA.

=== Popular culture ===
The term "Swiss Army knife" has entered popular culture as a metaphor for usefulness and adaptability.

The multi-purpose nature of the tool has also inspired a number of other gadgets.

The Swiss Army knife has been added to the collection of the Museum of Modern Art in New York and Munich's State Museum of Applied Art for its design.

In both the original television series MacGyver and its 2016 reboot, character Angus MacGyver frequently uses different Swiss Army knives in various episodes to solve problems and construct simple objects.

A particularly large Wenger knife model, Wenger 16999, has inspired a large number of humorous reviews on Amazon. This model was recognized by Guinness World Records as 'The World's Most Multifunctional Penknife'.

=== Daily linguistic use ===
The term "Swiss Army knife" has acquired usage as a figure of speech indicating a multifaceted skillset.

In sports, the term is used to describe utility players who can play multiple positions. For example, Taysom Hill has been nicknamed such because he has played quarterback, tight end, and special teams in the National Football League. In baseball, Michael Lorenzen was called a Swiss Army knife for his ability to be both a pitcher and outfielder.

When U.S. District Court for the Southern District of California Roger Benitez overturned California's 30-year-old ban on assault weapons in Miller v. Bonta, he compared the Swiss Army knife to the AR-15 rifle in the first sentence of his opinion,

"Like the Swiss Army Knife, the popular AR-15 rifle is a perfect combination of home defense weapon and homeland defense equipment."

In response, California Governor Gavin Newsom stated that the comparison "completely undermines the credibility of this decision".

== Gallery ==
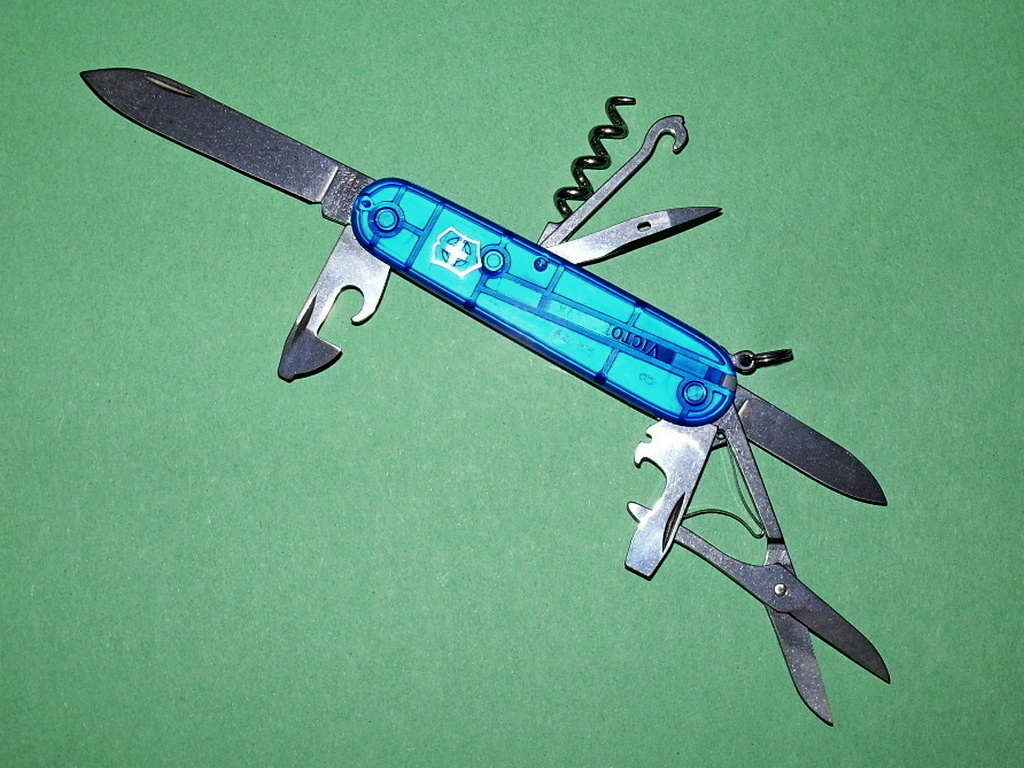
Victorinox Climber

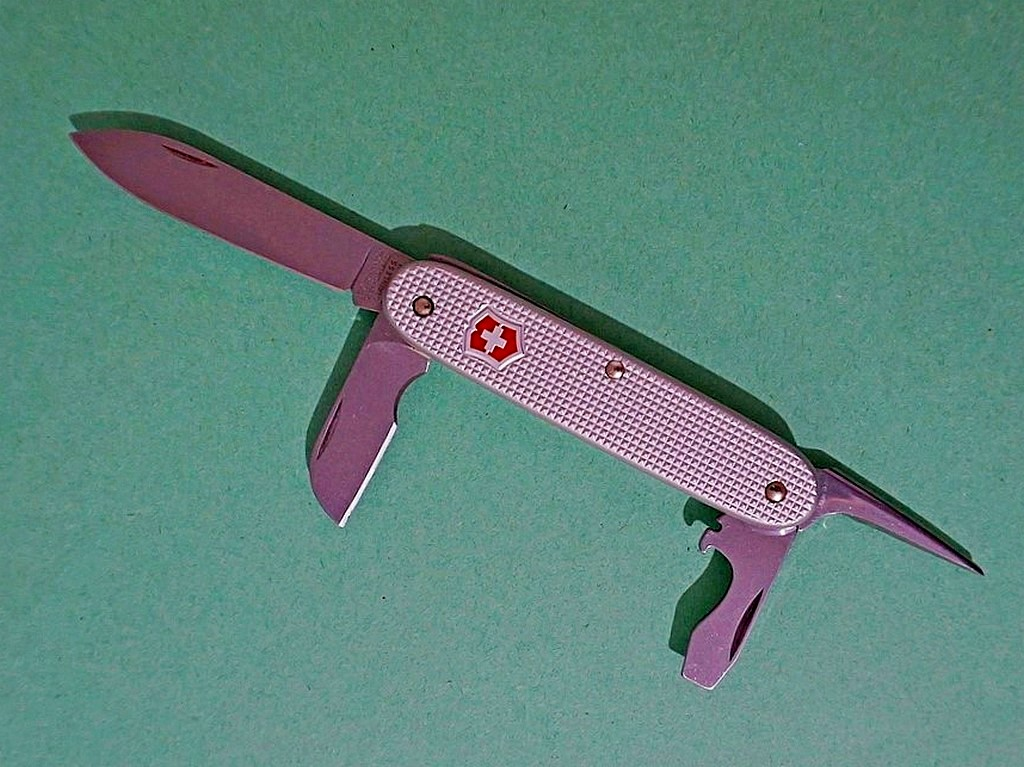
Victorinox Electrician

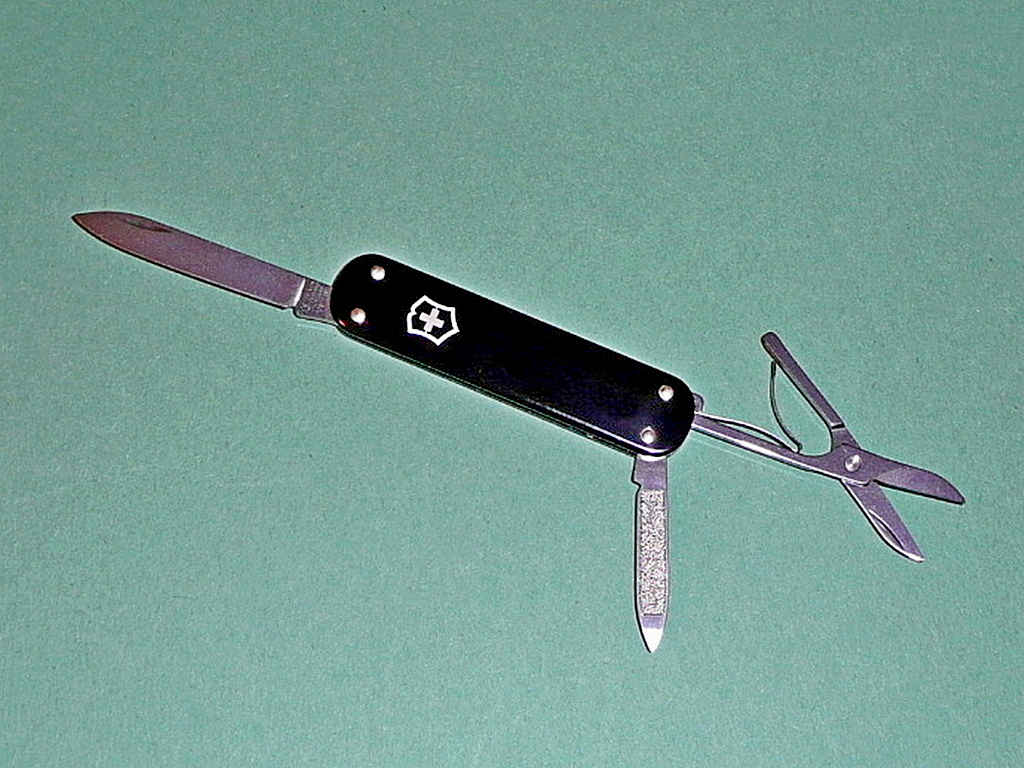
Victorinox Money-Clip

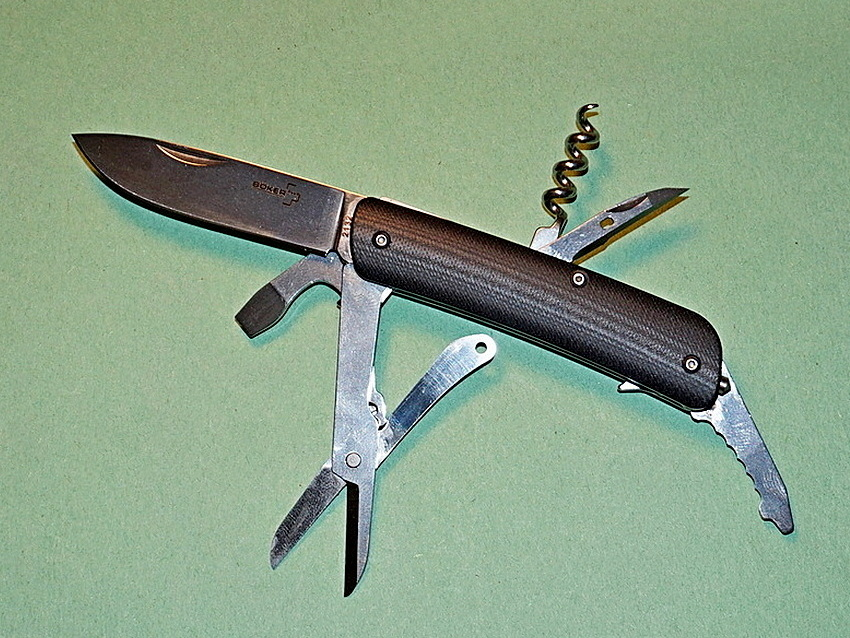
Boker Tech-Tool City 3

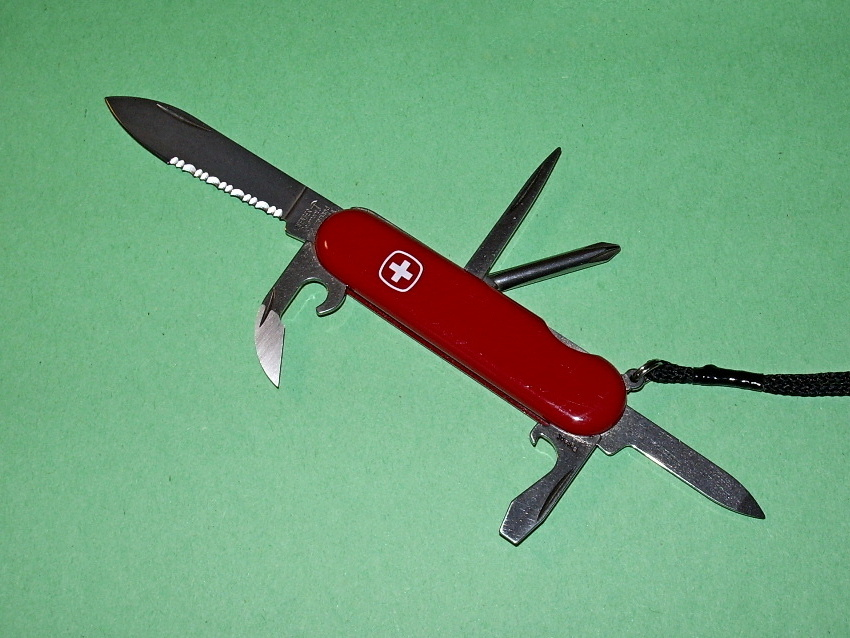
Wenger Highlander

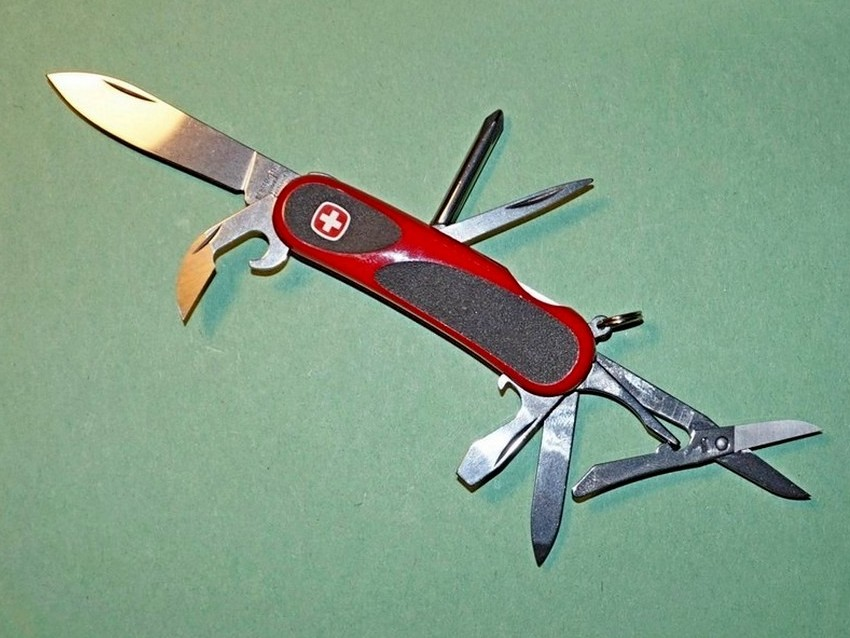
Wenger Evogrip 16

== See also ==
- Gerber multitool
- Leatherman
- Pocketknife
- Swiss Army Man, a 2016 film that features absurdist humor about manipulating a man's corpse like a multi-tool
