= Primary grind =

The primary grind is where a knife first begins to narrow into a cutting edge from the thickness of the main stock of the blade. The cross-sectional shape of the blade of a knife or sword is made up of different planes, or grinds. The sharp, cutting edge of the blade is often further ground at a secondary, or 'edge', bevel. This allows the blade to have more functions than otherwise possible with a strictly wedge or chisel shape.

The Swiss Army Knife is an example of a knife with a primary bevel and an edge bevel. By contrast, a blade composed of a single flat grind from stock thickness to the cutting edge is known as a 'full flat ground' blade. The cutting properties of a blade are determined by the type of metal, the hardness of the blade, and the grinding pattern (e.g. convex, concave, teardrop).
