= Buffs =

Buffs may refer to:

== Military ==
- Buffs (Royal East Kent Regiment), 1689–1961
- Queen's Own Buffs, The Royal Kent Regiment, 1961–1966
- 78th (Highlanders) Regiment of Foot (Ross-shire Buffs), 1793–1881
- Seaforth Highlanders (Ross-shire Buffs, The Duke of Albany's), 1881–1961
- Buffs, a company in The Queen's Own Rifles of Canada

== Sport ==
- Buffs (football club), Hong Kong
- Colorado Buffaloes, U.S.
- Kilwinning Rangers F.C., Scotland

== Other uses ==
- Royal Antediluvian Order of Buffaloes, a British fraternal organisation
- Two genera of African butterflies:
  - Baliochila
  - Pentila
- Cartier buffalo horn sunglasses

== See also ==
- Buff (disambiguation)
- BUF (disambiguation)
