= Glass nail file =

Nail file made with an abrasive type of glass

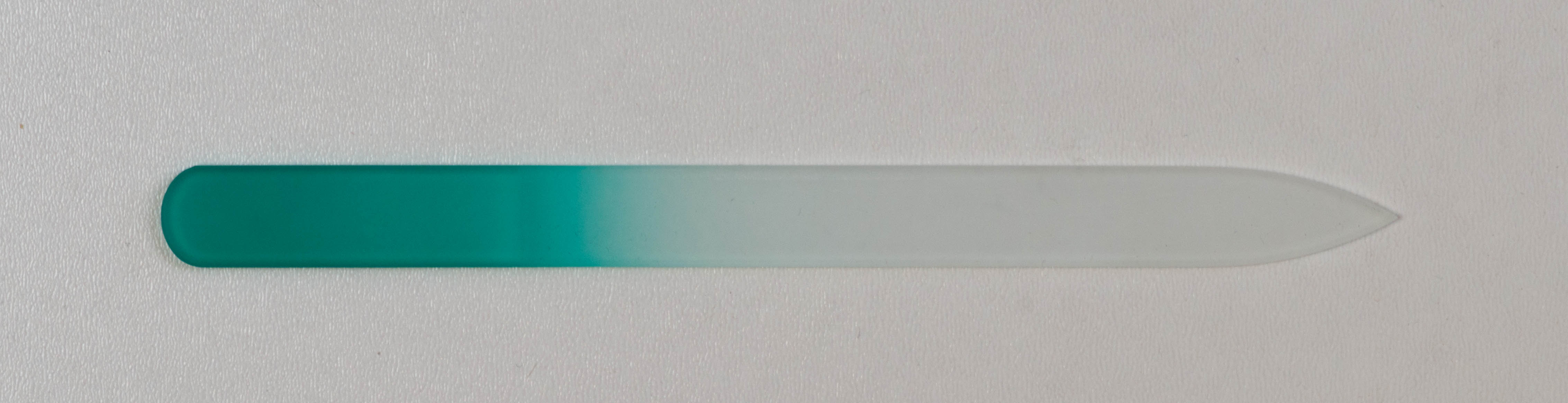
Green glass nail file

A glass nail file is a nail file with an abrasive surface made of glass, that is used to gently grind down and shape the edges of fingernails. They are often used in manicures and pedicures after the nail has been trimmed using nail clippers.

== Origin ==
In 1997, a new technology for making glass nail files was invented in the Czech Republic, using hardened Bohemian glass, by Dalibor Blažek from Blažek Glass s.r.o company. The special procedure of thermal hardening resulted in advantages such as excellent shock-proofness and an extremely durable polishing surface. It had a fine-grained steady abrasive surface created by etching in a solution of acids, which allowed grinding nails without any pain or damaging the fingernail structure.

== Types and sizes ==
Dimensions of the glass nail files can also be different - from the smallest (length 70 mm, thickness 2 mm) to the largest (length 195 mm, 3–6 mm thick).

Types and sizes of a glass nail file: Glass nail files of the largest sizes are used, as a rule, for pedicures. Some also produced with special glass for daily use, of for example, masters in beauty salons. Such nail files have only one working side, so as not to injure the manicure masters' finger skin.

== Production technology ==
Glass nail file — a file for fingernails care — is made of glass. In the course of manufacturing, the material is tempered using the traditional methods of glaziers. As a result, the nail file gains a unique wear resistance. Nail files which are made of tempered glass can withstand falls onto the floor and intensive daily use. If such a nail file breaks, it is safe to touch the glass fragments.

Production of glass nail files is a step-by-step process

- Manufacture of glass sheets of particular size with smooth surface;
- Cutting nail files out of the sheets;
- Processing of the glass surface, chemical etching to obtain a fine-grained abrasive surface;
- Turning the blade edges to make it safer;
- Thermal tempering of glass to give it firmness;
- The final stages of production — nail file decorating:
- Coloring which is fixed by the means of thermal processing;
- More complicated and refined ways of decoration — hand painting, printing, engraving and incrustation with crystals;

== Distinctive features ==
Mild care: Due to the granular surface the glass nail file doesn't injure fingernails during manicure, grinding them softly and smoothly. With continuous use with such a nail file, the fingernails become stronger and cease to stratify.

Hygiene: A glass nail file is quickly and easily disinfected. It is enough to wash it in warm water with soap. With frequent use of this manicure tool, such as in beauty salons, the nail files undergo a process of boiling for additional cleaning, where neither the tool nor its decor are damaged.

Unique wear resistance: the granular surface of a glass nail file isn't erased even if used for several years. The depth of the working surface's relief decreases much more slowly than with equivalent use of a metal nail file.

Density: Hardened bohemian glass is known for its durability.

== See also ==
- Nail buffing
