= Help Scout =

Provider of help desk software

Help Scout PBC
- Company type: Private
- Industry: Software, SaaS
- Founded: April 17, 2011; 14 years ago
- Founders: Nick Francis, Jared McDaniel, Denny Swindle
- Headquarters: Boston, Massachusetts
- Products: Help Scout Help Desk, Docs, Beacon
- Services: Help desk software, email management, support automation
- Number of employees: 100
- Website: www.helpscout.com

Help Scout, (known as Help Scout PBC) is a global remote company headquartered in Boston, Massachusetts. It develops subscription-based help desk and knowledge base software for managing customer support.

Founded in 2011, the company serves over 10,000 customers across more than 140 countries, including notable clients like Buffer, Basecamp, Trello, Reddit, and AngelList. Help Scout transitioned to a fully remote company in 2020, with over 100 employees living in more than 80 cities worldwide.

== History ==
Help Scout was created in 2011 as a pivot from Brightwurks, a web design and consultancy firm previously founded by Nick Francis, Jared McDaniel, and Denny Swindle. The company was publicly launched during their participation in Techstars Boston, a startup accelerator program.

== Features and technology ==
=== Help Desk ===
Help Scout's support software operates like a shared email inbox. The platform enables large teams to provide customer support via email using their tool. It integrates with live chat, phone systems, CRMs, and email marketing tools.

=== Docs ===
In addition to the help desk platform, Help Scout offers Docs, a self-service knowledge base as a feature in 2013. Exporting documents requires API access and programming knowledge; there is no export to ZIP file containing HTML source code/CSS/assets, or PDF offerings at this time.

=== Beacon ===
Help Scout's embeddable widget, Beacon, provides users on a website with quick access to Docs and/or serves as a contact form.

=== Mobile ===
Help Scout launched its iOS app in January 2016 and its Android app in February 2017.

== Open source contribution ==
One of the developers at Help Scout created an open-source CSS framework used to style their marketing website. Named Seed, this framework is written using Sass and follows the BEM and ITCSS naming architecture. It employs modern JavaScript-like methodologies for scoping, modularization, and dependency management. More information and Getting Started documentation can be found at seedcss.com.

== Awards, recognition, and philanthropy ==
In December 2011, Help Scout participated in a fundraising initiative for Acumen, a charity fighting poverty, donating over $100,000 from the sale of a poster featuring Steve Jobs' quote “Here’s to the crazy ones.”

In November 2015, Help Scout was named by AppStorm as one of six customer service software offerings to delight customers on Mac. That year, it was also recognized as a “marketing tool to know” by Business2Community and a “game-changing software solution” for startups by Business.com. In 2016, BostInno’s listed Help Scout among the “16 Boston Startups To Watch in 2016”.

Help Scout's work culture and job descriptions have also been acknowledged, winning the “Best Job Description” award from The Workies Awards by Workable in 2015.

== See also ==
- Comparison of help desk issue tracking software
- Comparison of issue-tracking systems
