= Data buffer =

Memory used temporarily in data transfers

In computer science, a data buffer (or just buffer) is a region of memory used to store data temporarily while it is being moved from one place to another. Typically, the data is stored in a buffer as it is retrieved from an input device (such as an analog-to-digital converter) or just before it is sent to an output device (such as a digital-to-analog converter); however, a buffer may be used when data is moved between processes within a computer, comparable to buffers in telecommunications. Buffers can be implemented in a fixed memory location in hardware or by using a virtual data buffer in software that points to a location in the physical memory.

In all cases, the data stored in a data buffer is stored on a physical storage medium. The majority of buffers are implemented in software, which typically use RAM to store temporary data because of its much faster access time when compared with hard disk drives. Buffers are typically used when there is a difference between the rate at which data is received and the rate at which it can be processed, or in the case that these rates are variable, for example, in a printer spooler or in online video streaming, a storage (hard disk or flash memory) based buffer may be used. In a distributed computing environment, data buffers are often implemented in the form of burst buffers, which provide distributed buffering services.

A buffer often adjusts timing by implementing a queue (or FIFO) algorithm in memory, simultaneously writing data into the queue at one rate and reading it at another rate.

== Applications ==
Buffers are often used in conjunction with I/O to hardware, such as disk drives, sending or receiving data to or from a network, or playing sound on a speaker. A line to a rollercoaster in an amusement park shares many similarities. People who ride the coaster come in at an unknown and often variable pace, but the roller coaster will be able to load people in bursts (as a coaster arrives and is loaded). The queue area acts as a buffer—a temporary space where those wishing to ride wait until the ride is available. Buffers are usually used in a FIFO (first in, first out) method, outputting data in the order it arrived.

Buffers can increase application performance by allowing synchronous operations such as file reads or writes to complete quickly instead of blocking while waiting for hardware interrupts to access a physical disk subsystem; instead, an operating system can immediately return a successful result from an API call, allowing an application to continue processing while the kernel completes the disk operation in the background. Further benefits can be achieved if the application is reading or writing small blocks of data that do not correspond to the block size of the disk subsystem, which allows a buffer to be used to aggregate many smaller read or write operations into block sizes that are more efficient for the disk subsystem, or in the case of a read, sometimes to completely avoid having to physically access a disk.

== Telecommunication buffer ==
A buffer routine or storage medium used in telecommunications compensates for a difference in rate of flow of data or time of occurrence of events when data is transferred from one device to another.

Buffers are used for many purposes, including:

- Interconnecting two digital circuits operating at different rates.
- Holding data for later use.
- Allowing timing corrections to be made on a data stream.
- Collecting binary data bits into groups that can then be operated on as a unit.
- Delaying the transit time of a signal in order to allow other operations to occur.

== Examples ==
- The BUFFERS command/statement in CONFIG.SYS of DOS.
- The buffer between a serial port (UART) and a modem. The COM port speed may be 38400 bit/s while the modem may have only a 14400 bit/s carrier.
- The integrated disk buffer on a hard disk drive, solid-state drive or BD/DVD/CD drive.
- The integrated SRAM buffer on an Ethernet adapter.
- The Windows NT kernel also manages a portion of main memory as the buffer for slower devices such as sound cards and network interface controllers.
- The framebuffer on a video card.
- The streaming buffer used by streaming services such as YouTube and Netflix (whether web, app or software version), instead of a full download.

== History ==
An early mention of a print buffer is the "Outscriber" devised by image processing pioneer Russel A. Kirsch for the SEAC computer in 1952:

One of the most important problems in the design of automatic digital computers is that of getting the calculated results out of the machine rapidly enough to avoid delaying the further progress of the calculations. In many of the problems to which a general-purpose computer is applied the amount of output data is relatively big — so big that serious inefficiency would result from forcing the computer to wait for these data to be typed on existing printing devices. This difficulty has been solved in the SEAC by providing magnetic recording devices as output units. These devices are able to receive information from the machine at rates up to 100 times as fast as an electric typewriter can be operated. Thus, better efficiency is achieved in recording the output data; transcription can be made later from the magnetic recording device to a printing device without tying up the main computer.

== See also ==
- Buffer overflow
- Buffer underrun
- Circular buffer
- Disk buffer
- Frame buffer for use in graphical display
- Depth buffer, Stencil buffer, for different parts of image information
- Variable length buffer
- Optical buffer
- UART buffer
- ENOBUFS, POSIX error caused by lack of memory in buffers
- Write buffer, a type of memory buffer
- Zero-copy
