= Optical buffer =

Device capable of storing light

In telecommunications, an optical buffer is a device that is capable of temporarily storing light. Just as in the case of a regular buffer, it is a storage medium that enables compensation for a difference in time of occurrence of events.

More specifically, an optical buffer serves to store data that was transmitted optically (i.e., in the form of light), without converting it to the electrical domain.

== Optical networks ==
Today, computer networks consist of optical fiber links, interconnected by electrical nodes. The data transport in the backbone is done in the form of light, typically from LED or laser. DWDM technologies enable bitrates well beyond 1 Tbit/s. However, at the nodes, this light has to be converted to the electronic domain, in order to switch all data to their separate destinations. Due to rapidly increasing channel capacities, the switching capacity is becoming the bottleneck of the system. Currently, research activities focus on optical switching technologies, that involve fewer or no conversions from the optical to the electronic domain. An important problem however, is the buffering.

== Contention resolution ==
Whenever two or more data packets arrive at a network node at the same time and contend for the same output, external blocking occurs. All packets but one are perceived as superfluous, and have to be dealt with. Next to the obvious choice of dropping all excess packets, academic literature typically presents three solutions: buffering, deflection routing or wavelength conversion. Optical buffering uses fiber delay lines (FDLs) to delay the light, and is regarded as the most effective, but comes with the additional cost of the FDLs.

== Implementation of optical buffers ==
As light cannot be frozen, an optical buffer is made of optical fibers, and is generally much larger than a RAM chip of comparable capacity. A single fiber can serve as a buffer. However, a set of more than one is usually used. A possibility, for example, is to choose a certain length $D$ for the smallest fiber, and then let the second, third... have lengths $2 \cdot D, 3 \cdot D,\ldots$. Another typical example is to use a single loop, in which the data circulates a variable number of times.

== Research ==
Currently, research on optical buffers is performed in two separate fields. One is to investigate on the technological implementation of this buffer, and try to reduce the size by using slow-light devices. The other is to better overall performance, by using stochastics. (Further detail on the latter approach can be found e.g. on the author's homepage.)
