= Evelyn Buff-Segal =

American expressionist artist (1913–2000)

Evelyn Buff-Segal (1913 – 2000) was an abstract expressionist painter who lived and worked in Rochester, New York.

== Early life ==
Evelyn E. Buff was born as a twin in 1915, in Lowville, Lewis County, New York to Fannie (née Landsman) and Louis R. Buff. Originally a student of architect Fritz Traut, she began studying under Vanclive Vitleture after meeting him during a visit to Martha's Vineyard in the late 1940s. He encouraged her to move to NYC and attend the prestigious Arts Students League on 57th Street, where she met Robert Rauschenberg. In a 1975 interview for the Rochester Oral History Project, Buff-Segal recalls that Robert Rauschenberg "had the easel to my right." and that among her other classmates at the time were both Paul Jenkins and Robert Cartwright.

As a mature artist she split her time between New York and Paris and was known for her compositions inspired by visits to Nigeria with her husband Dr. Harry J. Segal. In 1951 a special exhibition of these works entitled "Home to Nigeria" was featured at the College of Visual Arts in Syracuse, NY. That same year she founded the Rochester Arts Council (one of only three such groups in the country at the time) and served as its president until 1959. She also founded Rochester's 'Arena Arts Group' and served as director and co-founder of The Little Gallery.

Her work has been displayed at the Corcoran Gallery of Art in Washington, DC and the former Greer Gallery in NYC. Several pieces reside as part of the permanent collection of Emily Lowe Gallery at Syracuse University as well as in numerous private collections both in America and Europe.

== Notable exhibitions ==
- Rundel Gallery and Memorial Art Gallery, University of Rochester, Rochester, NY, 1951.
- Terry Institute, Miami, Florida, 1953.
- Concoran Gallery, Washington D.C. 1959.
- Sisti Gallery, Buffalo, NY, 1960
- Parma Gallery, NY, 1961.
- David Herbert NY, 1961.
- Greer Gallery, NY, April, 1962.
- Chautauqua Art Association Second National Juried Show, NY, 1963.
