= Metal ion buffer =

A metal-ion buffer provides a controlled source of free metal ions in a manner similar to the regulation of hydrogen ion concentration by a pH buffer A metal-ion buffer solution contains the free (hydrated) metal ion along with a complex compound formed by the association of the ion with a ligand in excess. The concentration of free metal ion depends on the total concentration of each component (ligand and metal ion) as well as on the stability constant of the complex. If the ligand can undergo protonation, the concentration of the free metal ion depends also on solution pH.

A considerable improvement in the detection limit of a liquid-membrane ion-selective electrode has been achieved by using a metal-ion buffer as internal solution.
