= Drop point =

Style of knife blade

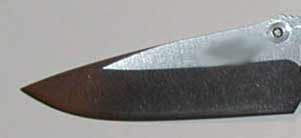
Drop point knife blade

Drop point is a style of knife blade that slopes on the spine of the blade from the handle of the knife to the tip of the blade. This allows the spine of the blade (where the blade is thicker, and thus stronger) to continue forward to the tip of the blade. This way the point is also aligned with the center axis of the knife, eliminating any pitch momentum when stabbing.

The curve on the top of a drop-point blade is always convex, which is what distinguishes it from a clip point blade. The drop point is a common design for hunting.

== See also ==
- Clip point
- Spear point
- Tanto point
