= Sebastian Buff =

Swiss painter

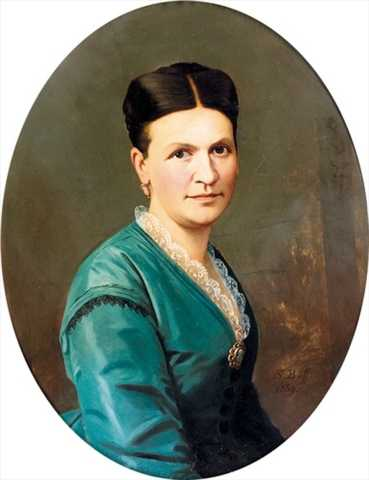
Portrait of an elegant lady, 1869.

Sebastian Buff (c.1829–1880) was a Swiss portrait painter.

== Life ==
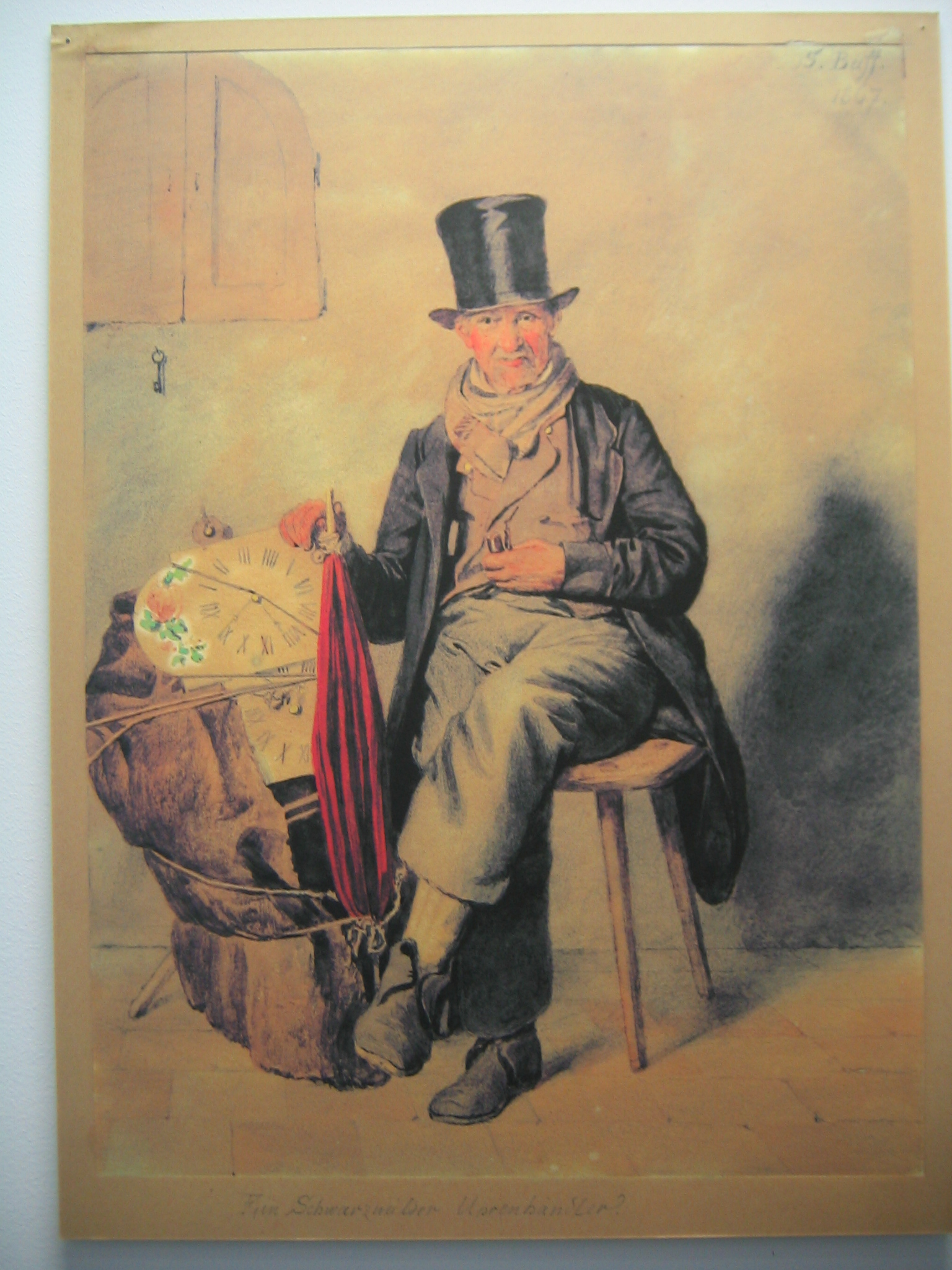
A watch bearer's pause, 1867.

Buff was born in 1829. He studied painting with the portraitist Leonhard Tanner in St Gallen, before continuing his education at Munich and Paris. Besides portraits he painted genre works which were much sought after. He died at Herisau in 1880.
