= Nail file =

Tool to shorten fingernails and toenails

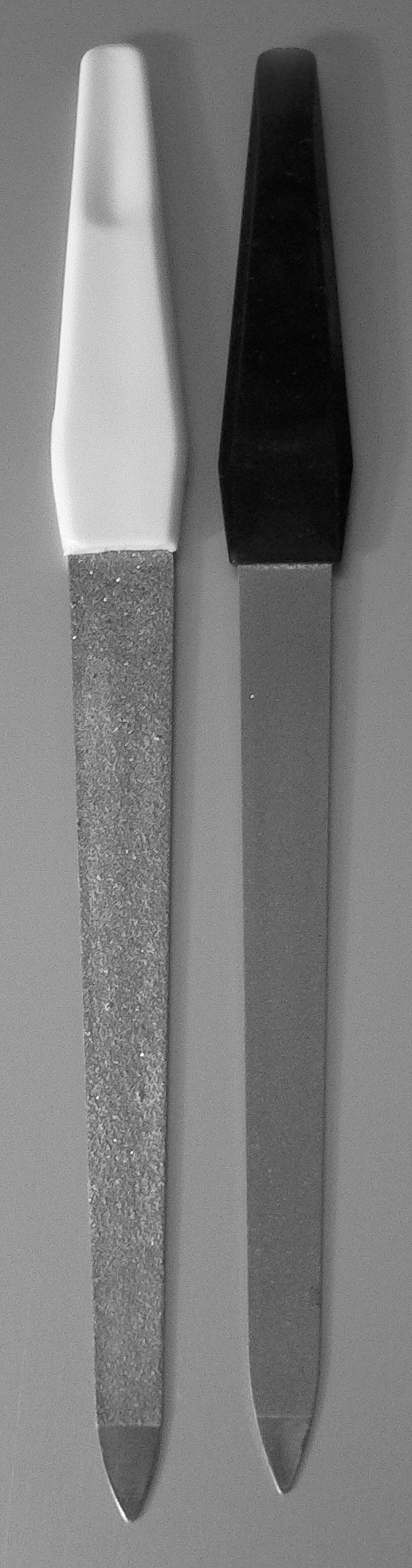
Nail files

A nail file is a tool that can be used to gently grind down and shape the edges of nails. They are often used in manicures and pedicures after the nail has been trimmed using appropriate nail clippers. Nail files may either be emery boards, ceramic, glass, crystal, plain metal files or metal files coated with corundum.

A nail drill is a powered rotary tool, which is used by a nail technician to file nails in a faster, more precise way.

== Materials ==
=== Emery board ===
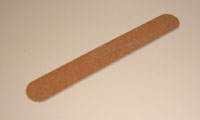
An emery board

Emery boards are small, flat, long objects that have emery or emery paper glued to them, making them both abrasive and flexible, used for fingernail and toenail care. They are used by manicurists to shape and smooth the nail during manicure and pedicure sessions. Emery boards are inexpensive and disposable, making them a sanitary alternative to metal nail files. The emery board was first patented by J. Parker Pray of New York in 1883.

Emery boards are generally less abrasive than metal nail files, and hence, emery boards may take longer to file down nails than metal nail files. Emery boards are usually less expensive than metal nail files and so can be economically disposed of after use on a single person. The nail can be smoothed and shaped accurately by taking light, even strokes in one direction across the top of the nail. Twenty to thirty easy strokes can typically shorten excessively long fingernails, while five to ten strokes are sufficient for shaping the nails.

Guitar players have also been known to use emery boards to smooth out calluses which may snag the strings of their guitars.

==== Emery pitches ====
Baseball pitchers and cricket bowlers have been known to use emery boards to scuff the outside of the ball. The roughness can offer more grip and hand control. Surface scratches also alter the ball's aerodynamics, making it more susceptible to spin and movement when in flight. However, the deliberate manipulation of the ball using an emery board is classified as cheating in baseball and cricket.

In a 1987, Major League Baseball incident, Joe Niekro of the Minnesota Twins was caught with an emery board in his pocket and suspended for ten games. He claimed it was for filing his nails.

=== Glass ===
Glass nail files are more recently available. Since glass nail files have a smoother and more even surface, they do not splinter the nail like emery boards or metal nail files. This makes them a preferred instrument by manicurists, although they are sometimes difficult to find in stores. Glass nail files come in very different qualities, some of them solid glass, others merely glass covered with an abrasive surface.

== History ==
Although the modern nail file only appeared at the end of the 19th century, evidence of nail file-like tools exist further back in history. Marie Antoinette was known for her fondness of the lime à ongles, which was a nail file-like tool made of pumice stone. When her perfectly shaped nails were seen, it became the latest female trend in the French Court of Versailles. The pumice stone was carved into a pencil-like shape, which was used to trim and shape the edges of the nail.

== See also ==
- Nail buffing
