= BUF =

BUF may refer to:

- Buffalo, New York, the second most populous city in the U.S. state of New York
  - Buffalo Bills, a National Football League team based in the Buffalo–Niagara Falls region
  - Buffalo Sabres, a National Hockey League team based in the Buffalo–Niagara Falls region
  - University at Buffalo, a public university known as "Buffalo" or "BUF"
  - Amtrak station code for Buffalo-Depew Rail Station in Buffalo, New York
  - IATA airport code for Buffalo Niagara International Airport, Buffalo, New York
- Baitul Futuh Mosque, London
- Black United Front, a civil rights organization based in Halifax, Nova Scotia
- British Union of Fascists, a former fascist political party in the United Kingdom
- BUF Compagnie, a French visual effects company
