= Buff (nickname) =

Buff is a nickname of:

- E. U. Curtis Bohlen (born 1927), former president of the World Wildlife Fund and former United States Assistant Secretary of State for Oceans and International Environmental and Scientific Affairs
- Aldo Donelli (1907–1994), American football player and college and National Football League head coach, soccer player and college athletics administrator
- Buff Hardie, a member of the Scotland the What? comedy review act
- Geoff Hoon (born 1953), British politician
- Charles Kirkland (born 1950), American retired basketball player
- Buff Lord (1892–1985), English rugby league footballer
- Bob McCready (1940–2007), Canadian box lacrosse goaltender
- Buff Milner (1946–1996), New Zealand rugby union player
- Buff Wagner (1897–1962), American football player

== See also ==
- BUFF (Big Ugly Fat Fucker/Fella), a nickname of the Boeing B-52 Stratofortress bomber aircraft
