= Clip point =

Blade shape

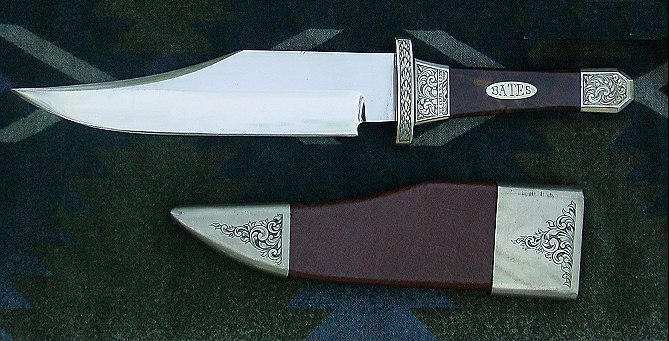
A Bowie knife clearly showing the clip point

The clip point is one of the three most common shapes for the blade of a knife (the others being the drop point and the spear point). Clip point blades have the appearance of having the forward third of the blade "clipped" off. The clip itself can be straight or concave.

== Description ==
Traditionally, the spine or unsharpened edge of the knife begins at the hilt and continues to a point between one third to one fourth of the blade length. The blade spine then tapers in thickness in either a straight line or a recurve to the knife's point, which may be located above, below, or in line with the central axis of the blade. The thinned false edge of the clip may be sharpened to form a true second cutting edge. If the false edge is sharpened it increases the knife's effectiveness in piercing.

== History ==
The clip point blade design dates back to at least Macedonian times, where examples of knapped flint clip point knives from the Eneolytic period have been unearthed at the estuary of Drim. Variants include the California clip, which uses a clip greatly extended in length, and the Turkish clip point with its extreme recurve. One of the most recognizable clip-point blades is used on the famous Bowie knife.

== Characteristics ==
The clip point style allows a quicker, and thus deeper, puncture upon insertion (clip point knives being thinner at the spine). The drop point has a slightly slower insertion due to its thicker spine near the tip. The drop point knife allows for more control when cutting, has a slower withdrawal time, and better negotiates "drawn out" (carving like) operations. The clip point lends itself to a quicker "stabbing" advantage with less drag during insertion and faster withdrawal. Compared to the drop point design, the clip point has a narrower and weaker tip. The clip point is also weaker than the spear point, and for this reason the latter is favored for most thrusting knives, such as the dagger.
