= Time of occurrence =

Part of forensic science

In forensic investigation, the time of occurrence of an event (such as time of death, time of incident) is one of the most important things to determine accurately as soon as possible. Sometimes this can only be estimated. Some indicators that investigators use are rigor mortis, livor mortis, algor mortis, clouding of the corneas, state of decomposition, presence/absence of purged fluids and level of tissue desiccation.

Pathologists can estimate a time of death by analysing necrophagous diptera. The odour from decaying flesh attracts different species as the stages of decomposition progress.
