= Joe Buff =

American novelist

- Education: New York University (BA); Massachusetts Institute of Technology (MA)
- Occupation: Author
- Spouse: Sheila Buff
- Writing career
- Genre: Techno-thriller
- Website: www.joebuff.com

Joe Buff is an American author of naval techno-thrillers, including the bestseller Tidal Rip. Before becoming a full-time writer in 1997, he was an actuary for 20 years.

== Jeffrey Fuller series ==
Buff's novels take place in the years 2011–2012. In his novels, Boer reactionaries seize control of the government of South Africa. The UN places economic sanctions on South Africa. In response, South Africa begins to sink merchant shipping belonging to the United Kingdom and the United States. NATO immediately mobilizes and a large convoy sets sail towards South Africa with only Germany holding out due to "social unrest".

Halfway to South Africa, there is a revolt in Germany. The Hohenzollern family is crowned as Kaiser, but the Kaiser is nothing more than a figurehead. The German government declares its support for South Africa and both nations form the Boer-Berlin Axis.

In a pre-planned move, Germany and South Africa use tactical nuclear warheads to destroy a NATO convoy, Warsaw, and Tripoli. These moves force Continental Europe to surrender out of fear of being in a nuclear war. Most of the world stays neutral out of fear or greed or both. Cash-strapped Russia is selling the Boer-Berlin Axis weapons and intelligence. On the side of the allies, only America, the United Kingdom, Mexico, the Republic of Ireland, Chile, Venezuela, Costa Rica, Australia, New Zealand, Canada, and several unnamed African nations are still fighting, with Cuba quietly supporting them. Although through the course of the war, Brazil, Egypt, Israel, Jordan, Turkey, India, Indonesia, most of the Middle East, Afghanistan, Pakistan, and Russia join the Allies. Tactical nuclear warheads are now the weapon of choice with a gentleman's agreement not to hit any civilians. The story then starts with Deep Sound Channel on the high-tech ceramic-hulled submarine the U.S.S. Challenger outside of Diego Garcia.

The novels in the series are:

- Deep Sound Channel, 2000
- Thunder in the Deep, 2001
- Crush Depth, 2002
- Tidal Rip, 2003
- Straits of Power, 2004
- Seas of Crisis, 2005

== Personal life ==
Buff is a graduate of New York University, where he received his BA in mathematics, and the Massachusetts Institute of Technology, where he received his MA in mathematics. He lives in Dutchess County, New York with his wife Sheila Buff, who is herself a writer and whom he met in college. Buff has five siblings; they work in the field of medicine.
