= Buffer (application) =

Social management software

- Developers: Buffer, Inc.
- Release: November 30, 2010; 15 years ago
- Stable release: 4.1.2 / January 10, 2015; 11 years ago
- Platform: Android, iOS, web
- Size: 13.5 MB
- Available in: English
- Website: buffer.com

Buffer is a software application for the web and mobile, designed to manage accounts in social networks, by providing the means for a user to schedule posts to Bluesky, YouTube, Twitter, Facebook, Mastodon, Instagram, Threads, Pinterest, TikTok and LinkedIn, as well as analyze their results and engage with their community. It is owned by remote company Buffer Inc.

The application was designed by a group of European expats in San Francisco, most notably Joel Gascoigne and Leo Widrich. Gascoigne is currently the CEO of Buffer.

== History ==
Buffer began its development in October 2010 in Birmingham, United Kingdom by co-founder Joel Gascoigne, who established the idea of the social media application while he was in the United Kingdom.

On November 30, 2010, the initial version of Buffer was launched as bfffr.com. It contained limited features which only allowed access to Twitter. Four days after the software's launch Buffer gained its first paying user. A few weeks after this, the number of users reached 100, and then that number multiplied to 100,000 users within the next 9 months.

In 2013, Buffer intentionally made its salary calculation algorithm public (along with the calculated salaries of its 13 employees; this number has since grown to exceed 80, almost all of whom opt-in to the salary-publishing culture).

== Features ==
Buffer has both free and paid plans.

=== Buffer for Business ===
Buffer for Business was a tier of the Buffer application aimed at businesses and corporations. Launched in 2013, it offered team collaboration and expanded analytics features compared to Buffer's consumer plans.

In June 2026, Buffer was among the apps added to LinkedIn's "connected apps" feature, which lets members display automatically generated, verified descriptions of how they use third-party tools directly on their profiles.

== Data ==
Buffer publishes original data that analyzes posts sent through the platform. Including an analysis of 2 Million LinkedIn posts, as well as 150,000 TikTok posts.

== Popularity and growth ==
After its establishment in 2010, Buffer's total revenue per year increased to $1 million in January 2013, and then crossed $2 million in September of the same year through the growth of customers using the application. By September 2013, Buffer gained 1 million users, with around 16,000 paying users. The number of posts shared through Buffer application crossed 87,790,000 posts and the number of accounts that were used through the application reached 1,266,722, with an average of 70 posts per account.

== Acquisitions ==
In December 2015, Buffer acquired Respondly, a social media customer service and brand monitoring tool, which it has since rebranded to Reply. According to the terms of the contract, the cost of the acquisition was not released.

== Security ==
In October 2013, Buffer's system was hacked, allowing the hackers to get access to many users’ accounts. This resulted in the hackers posting spam posts through many of the user's social media accounts. On October 26, 2013, Buffer was temporarily suspended as a result of the hacking. Co-founder Joel Gascoigne sent an email to all users, apologizing about the issue and advising Buffer users about what steps they should take. Buffer was then unsuspended within the same week.

== Related products and services ==
Daily, launched in May 2014, was an iOS app developed by Buffer that helped users manage their social media accounts on Twitter, Facebook, LinkedIn and Google+. In the app, a user could accept and share, or dismiss, suggested links and headline through Tinder-style swiping gestures.

In March 2015, Buffer launched Pablo, a social media image creation tool. Its aim is to create engaging pictures for social media within 30 seconds. Pablo was sunset in 2024.
