= Nail buffing =

Polishing the nail surface

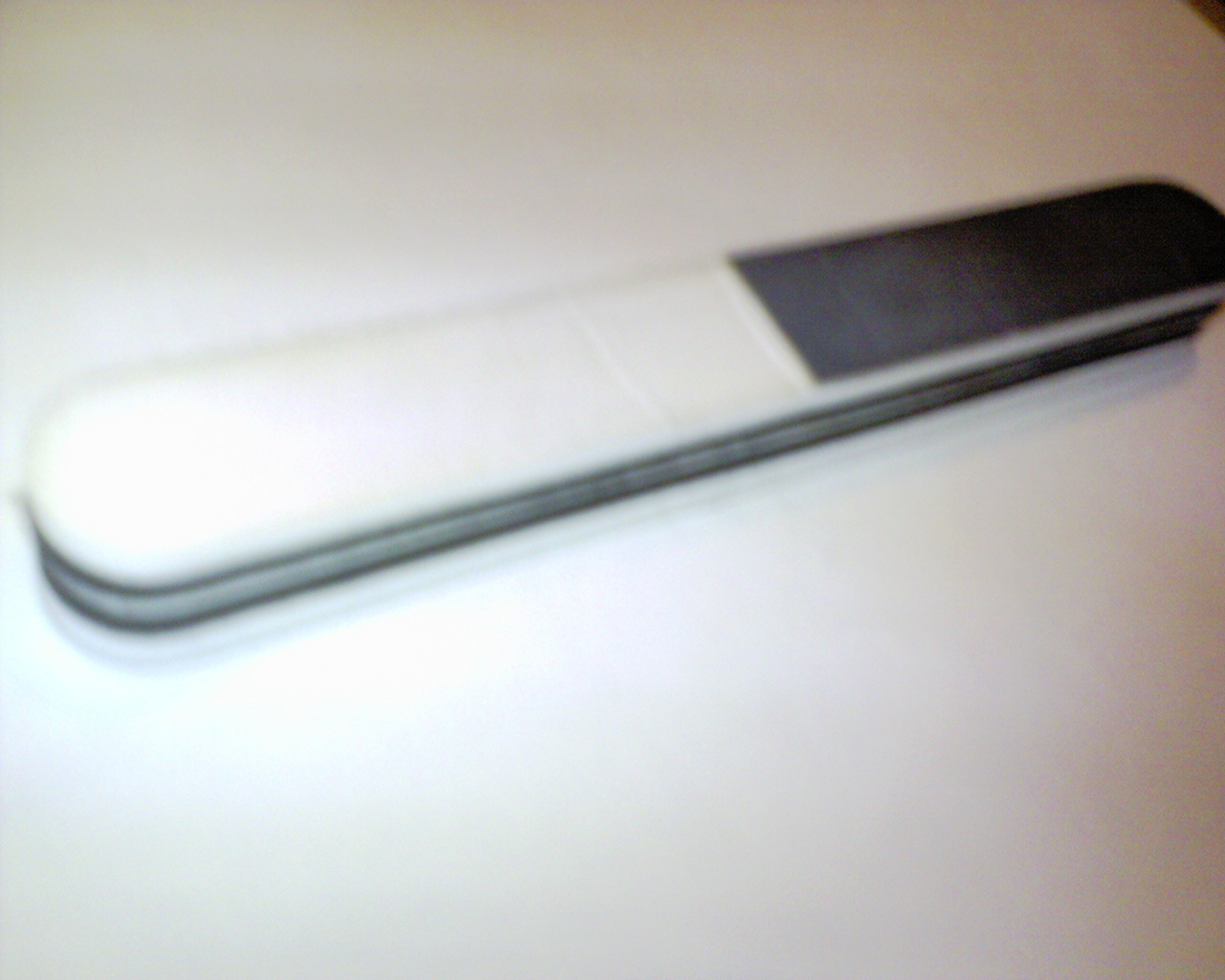
Nail buffer

Nail buffing is the act of polishing the nail using buffers of successively finer grit in order to make nails look more consistent and shiny. A paste is used to fill ridges on nail surfaces.

Buffing is also done prior to the application of nail products or artificial nails to help the product adhere to the nail. However, excessive buffing should be avoided.

== Technique ==
- The emery board nail file should not be used to buff the surface of the nails. They are meant only to shape them from the side.
- The medium grit can be used to smooth ridges and surface irregularities. This can be done before applying nail polish or as a first step before finer buffing.
- The fine-grained buff is used to smooth the nail to a matte surface.
- The finest finishing grit gives the nails a glossy shine.

Traditionally, a buffing cream and chamois skin have been used. Modern instruments are much more efficient and are similar in appearance to a large rubber eraser, with different sides for different levels of coarseness. As buffing is gentle surface abrasion, it should not be performed too strongly or too often or thinning of the nail may result.

In a manicure, nail buffing is an alternative to chemical nail polish.

== In gel manicures ==
Buffing is used prior to the application of gel nail polish to help the polish adhere better to the nail. For best adhesion results after buffing, the nail technician should remove any excess buffing oil before polishing.

== Safety ==
Applying excessive pressure while buffing can generate heat and pain and could possibly lead to infection. Excessive buffing for prolonged periods of time can also wear down the nail plate. While buffing, only 5% of the nail plate thickness should be removed.
