= Mercator K55K =

German-made pocket knife

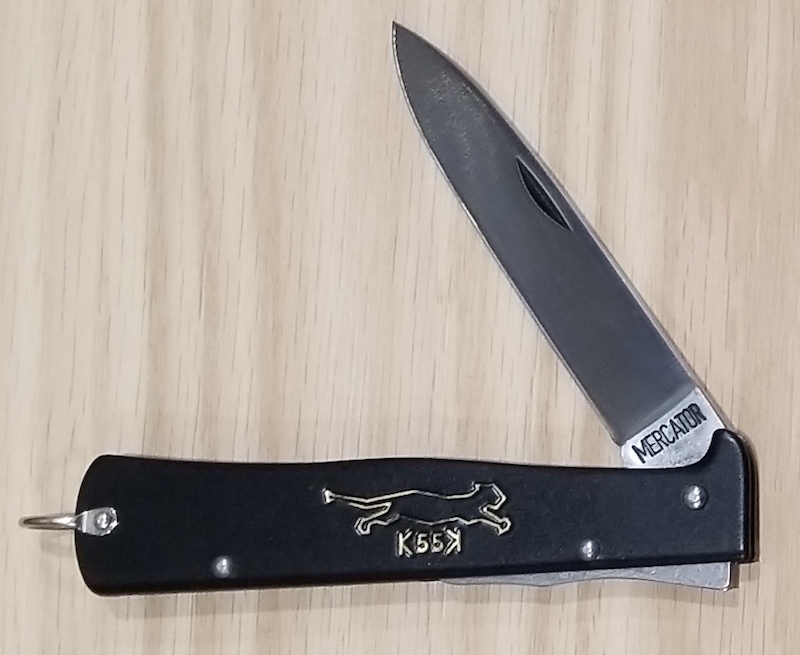
Otter-Messer Mercator K55K lock blade pocketknife

The Mercator K55K is a type of lock blade pocketknife produced in Solingen [ˈzoːlɪŋən] Germany. Mercator brand knives were originally produced by Heinrich Kaufmann & Sons in Solingen, which operated from 1856 to 1995. At introduction, the K55k was originally fitted with a different lock and a somewhat longer blade of approximately 100mm. The design was variously described by Kaufmann as a pocket knife (taschenmesser), dagger (dolchmesser), or hunting knife (jagdnicker), emphasizing its steel frame, strong safety lock, and solid no-frills worksmanship. The Mercator K55K is still produced in Germany under the Mercator brand, now a division of Otter-Messer GmbH.

== Construction ==
In its present form, the Mercator K55K is of very simple construction, consisting of a single folded sheet metal handle, a 90mm long blade, a spring-operated blade release (lock), a fiber spacer, and a bail (clevis), with all parts secured by riveted pins. The handle is stamped with the outline of a leaping cat and the legend "K55K", with the second "K" facing backwards. The blade is constructed of either C75 carbon steel or DIN EN 1.4034 stainless steel. The blade locks in the open position (a lockback knife), and is closed by depressing an exposed button on the back of the handle.

In profile, the K55K is extremely slim (7mm excluding clevis), with a weight of only 76 grams. Its construction is similar to that of the later French Douk-Douk knife, as both utilize a simple folded sheet-metal handle. However, the Douk-Douk is a slipjoint, whereas the K55K has a locking blade with different blade geometry.

The designation "K55K" with the inversed second K was code for the original producer's main office in Solingen and the knife model designation. This code deciphered as; "K" for "Kaufmann" (the name of the original manufacturer), "55" for "Hochstraße 55" (the address of the original company residence in Solingen, Germany), and the inversed second "K" (for "Katze" which translates to "cat" - the knife's main emblem).

== Copies ==
Copies of the Mercator K55K have been produced in other countries such as Japan, China and the United Kingdom.

== History ==
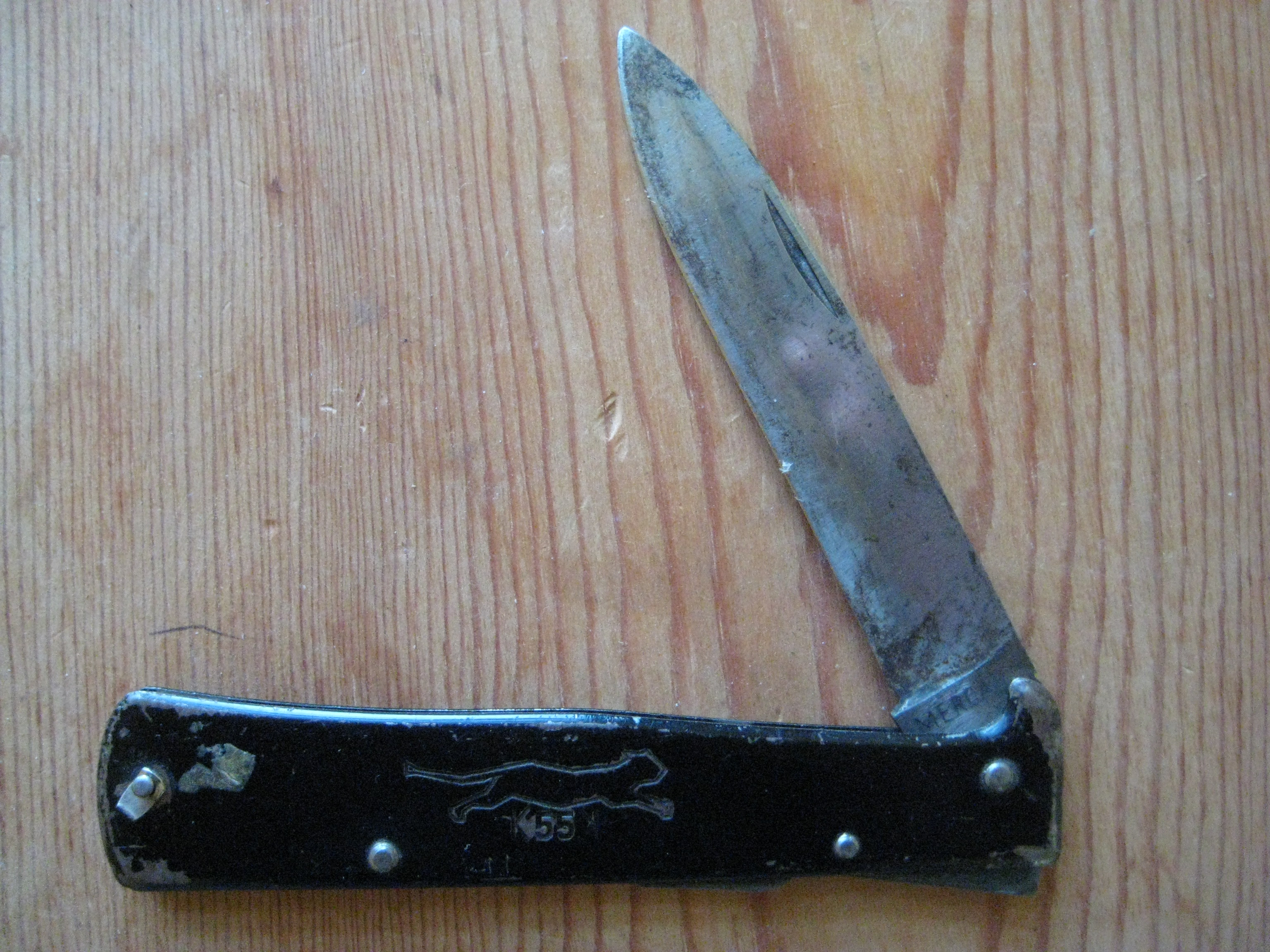
A well-used K55K

The actual date of introduction of the Mercator K55K knife is unknown, although Kaufmann & Sons registered patents for similar lock-blade knives as early as 1903 in Germany. There is no evidence that the Mercator K55K was ever adopted by the German armed forces as an official item of equipment. However, as the K55K was widely advertised and sold throughout Germany for many years, it is probable that many German soldiers purchased these knives privately for their own use, including wartime service. Following the end World War II, Kaufmann & Son resumed production of the Mercator K55K in Solingen.

=== US Market ===
At the conclusion of World War II, returning US servicemen brought Mercator K55K knives home from Germany, eventually generating a new export market for the manufacturer. By the 1950s, the inexpensive knife could be found for sale in the USA via mail order or in retail stores. However, the knife's low cost and concealability also attracted the interest of delinquent urban youth, especially after switchblade knife laws took effect. By the mid-1960s, the "K55K" or "K55" was described as the "weapon of choice among the older teenagers of the South Bronx."

The K55K and its reported use in criminal activity declined drastically in the United States after the 1970s, as youth gangs and criminals turned to firearms instead of edged weapons. For a time, the knife enjoyed some popularity with US manufacturers who required a low-cost knife they could relabel with a company logo for internal use by their work force.

=== Current Usage ===
While the K55K is no longer inexpensive, it is still exported to the USA, Canada, and other countries where it remains legal, principally for use as an outdoorsman's knife.
