= Douk-Douk =

French-made pocket knife

The douk-douk is a French-made pocket knife of simple sheet-metal construction. It has been manufactured by the M. C. Cognet cutlery firm in Thiers, France, since 1929.

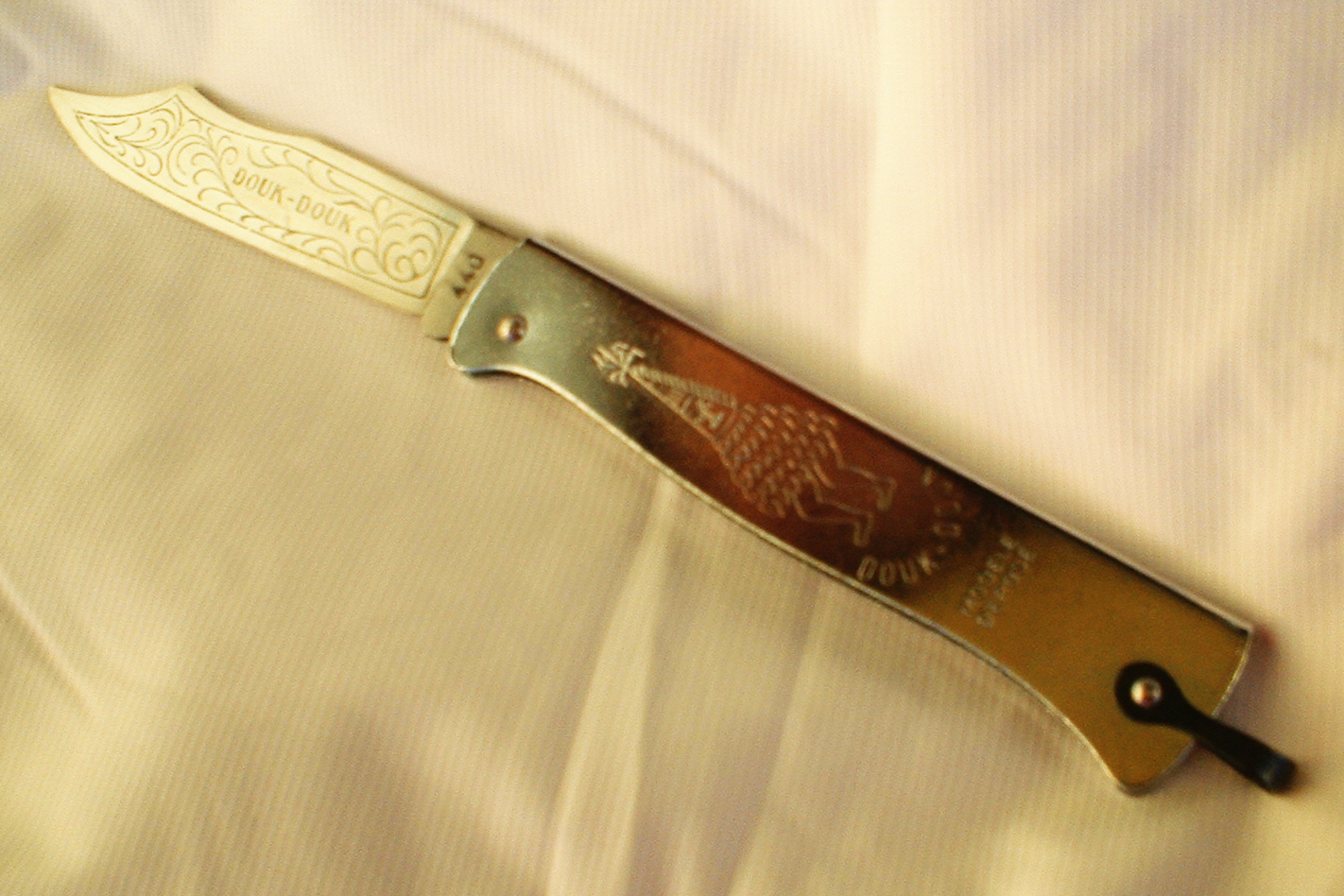
Douk douk 200mm

== Design origins ==
The external engraving of the douk-douk was created in 1929 by Gaspard Cognet of Cognet, Antoine & Gaspard for sales to France's colonies in Oceania. The handle depicts a "douk-douk", or Melanesian spirit incarnation. Cognet based the design on an engraving he found in an illustrated dictionary. To promote sales in other regional markets where the Melanesian design was either unknown or even offensive for cultural or religious reasons, the douk-douk was inscribed with new designs such as "El-Baraka" (blessing: French Algeria), "Le Tiki" (ancestor: Polynesia), and ("L'écureuil" squirrel: French Canada).

Originally intended as an inexpensive utility knife for the ordinary working man, the widespread popularity of the douk-douk soon caused it to be utilized as a weapon. During the 1954-1962 FLN-led revolt in Algeria, the douk-douk was used as weapon of assassination and terror. Algerians who ran afoul of the FLN frequently had their noses removed with locally-obtained El-Baraka douk-douk knives. When used as weapon, users sometimes converted the douk-douk into a fixed-blade dagger by the simple expedient of hammering the ends of the sheet-metal handle together behind the blade's bolster, locking the blade into open position.

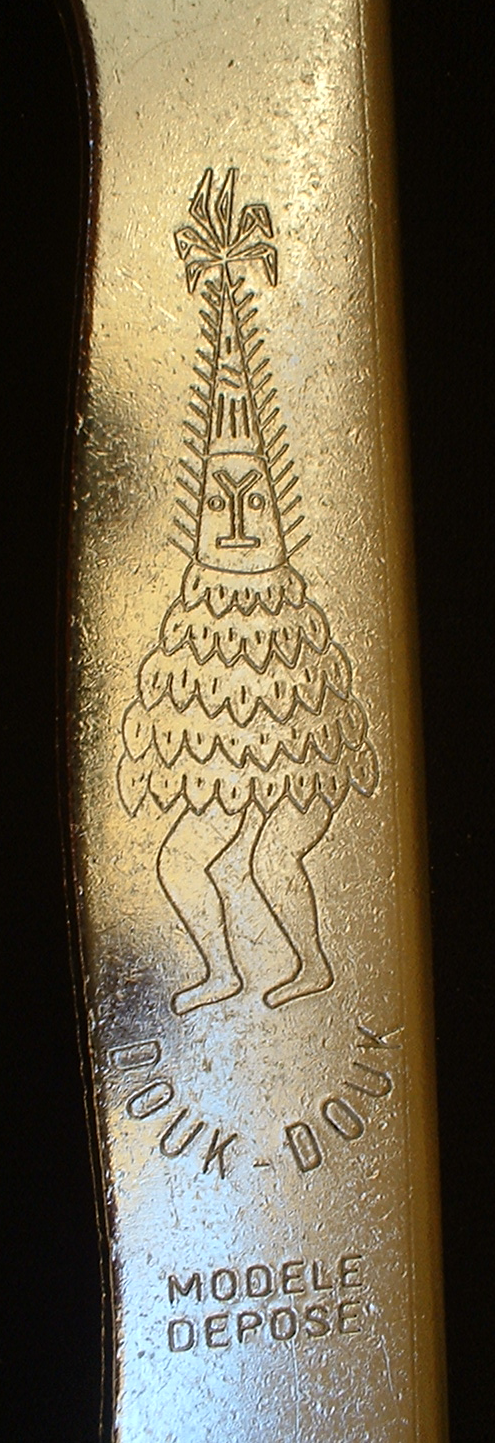
The engraved handle of a Douk Douk (modèle déposé indicates the image is trademarked)

== Description ==
The douk-douk is a very simple slipjoint knife, having no locking mechanism, but only a very strong backspring to bias it towards the open, closed and 90 degree positions. This intermediate position is to help prevent the blade from snapping shut on the users fingers if the user accidentally folds the blade while cutting. The knife consists of only six parts:

- A folded sheet-metal handle, which is very slim
- A blade, of a soft and easily sharpened steel, generally of the "Turkish clip" profile reminiscent of a scimitar. The blade has indentations at the back, and is decorated with acid-engraved arabesques. The blade has no nail-nick, but is easily grasped for opening since it tapers at the spine.
- A strong backspring
- Two rivets: one to hold the blade, the other to hold the backspring and bail
- A metal bail or lanyard loop

The cutlery firm of M.C. Cognet has continued to produce the knife up to the present day, using the same simple methods. Today they are offered with several decorative designs, stainless or carbon steel blades, in three different sizes.

== Variants ==
Current variants

- Sorcier (Sorcerer) — Standard pattern. Blued handle, engraved with the image of "Douk Douk", a Melanesian mythical figure
- El-Baraka — Nickel-plated handle, engraved with a Tuareg Agadez Cross (allegedly marketed to Muslim colonies in North Africa where the humanoid figure of the Sorcier model would be culturally inappropriate)
- Tiki — Engraved with a Polynesian tiki idol
- l'Écureuil (Squirrel) — Nickel-plated handle, engraved with a squirrel. Primarily marketed within France. Unlike most other variants, L'écureuil has a spear profile blade.

== See also ==
- Higonokami - A similar traditional Japanese pocket knife
- Mercator K55K - Earlier, very similar German knife
- Okapi - A similar South African pocket knife
- Opinel - Another iconic French pocket knife with a simple, low cost design

== Sources ==
- Gérard Pacella. Couteaux de nos Terroirs. Editions de Borée, 2005. ISBN 2-84494-325-X, 9782844943255. Pg. 26
