= Laguiole knife =

Traditional Occitan pocketknife

Lagiole droit, the earliest form of laguiole knife

The Laguiole knife (French pronunciation: [laɡjɔl], locally [lajɔl]) is a traditional Occitan pocketknife originally produced in the "knife city" of Thiers, source of 70% of France's cutting tool production, as well as the small village of Laguiole, both located in the Massif Central region of France. Laguiole in this instance does not refer to any knife brand in France, where use of the name is not legally restricted, but to a generic type of traditional slipjoint knife of a sort associated with this French region, now made worldwide.

== History ==
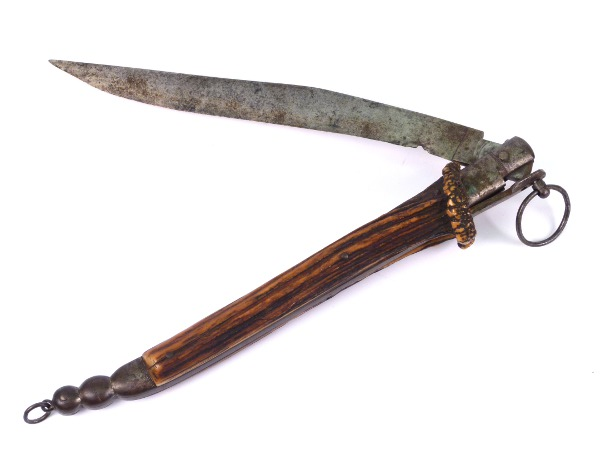
Spanish Navaja dating to c. 1790; it has the yataghan style blade and curved handle which influenced the development of the classic laguiole

The major influence on the form of the classic laguiole is most likely the Arabo-Hispanic clasp knife of Andalusian Spain, the navaja. The laguiole was first designed in 1829 by Jean-Pierre Calmels. The earliest forms of laguiole knife were straight-bladed and handled, the so-called laguiole droit; the classic navaja-like laguiole seems to have been developed around 1860.

The Calmels laguiole droit had a 'half-lock' on the blade where a small projection on the end of the backspring (mouche) exerts pressure on a corresponding indent in the heel of blade when the knife is open; this, and not the full locking system of the navaja, remained a fixed feature in subsequent laguiole knives. Seasonal migrations of shepherds and cattle herders between Catalan Spain and southern France in summer and winter introduced the navaja to France.

The Arabo-Hispanic design of the navaja was merged with that of local folding knives represented by older patterns such as the laguiole droit and Capuchadou; the result became the classic laguiole. In 1840, the first awl or trocar (a surgical instrument used to puncture body cavities and relieve the suffering of cattle and other animals with bloat) was added to the some laguiole knife patterns. In 1880, some models of the laguiole began featuring a corkscrew, in response to demands from the owners of bars in the Auvergne, and restaurants in Paris.

== Design ==
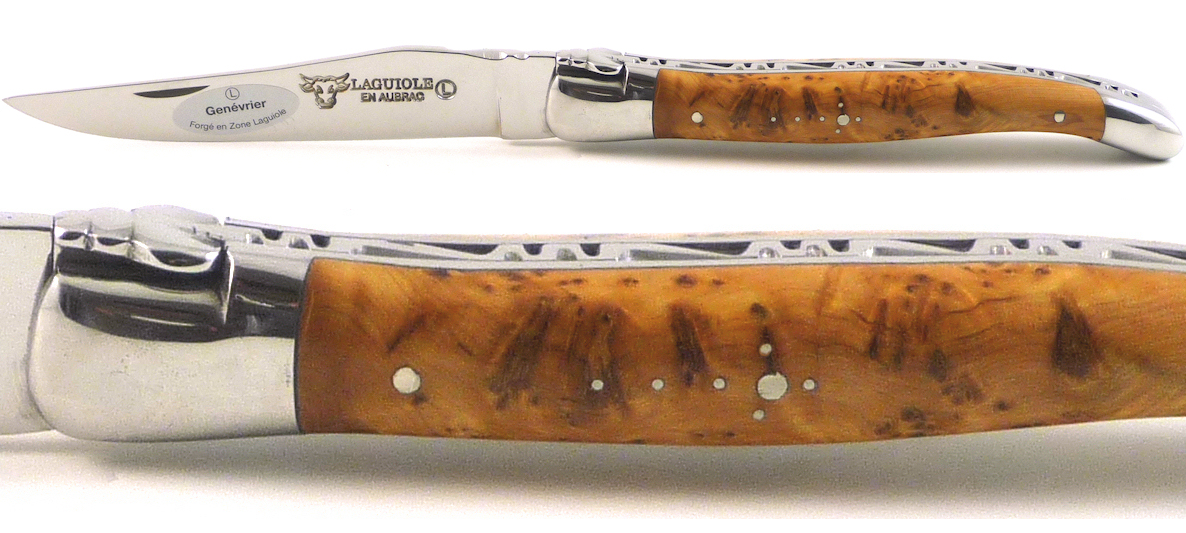
A modern laguiole folding knife of classic form with the blade open; the wooden grip scale shows the typical cross made of metal pins

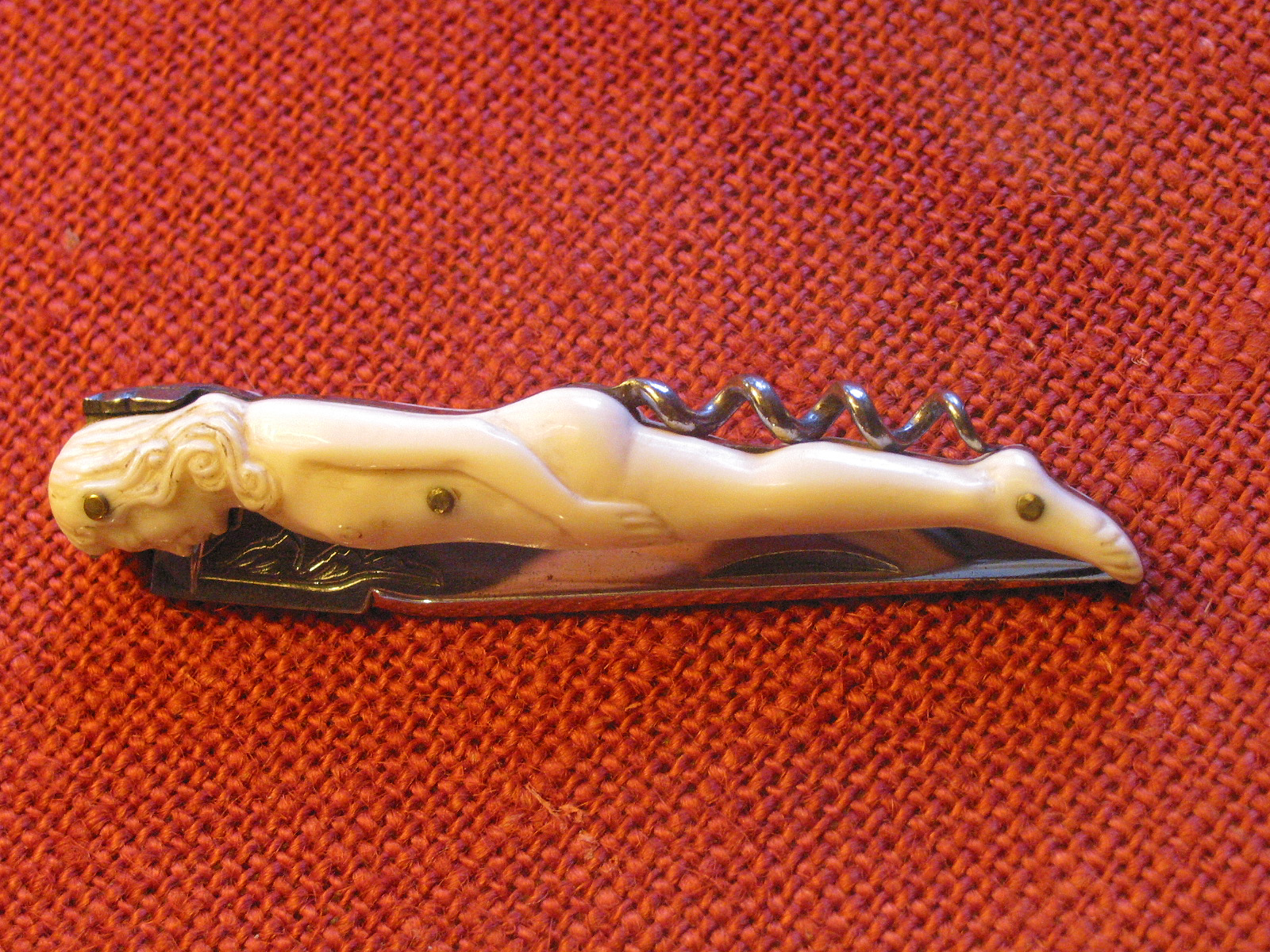
An early twentieth-century laguiole knife with a corkscrew, the carved ivory handle in the form of a nude woman

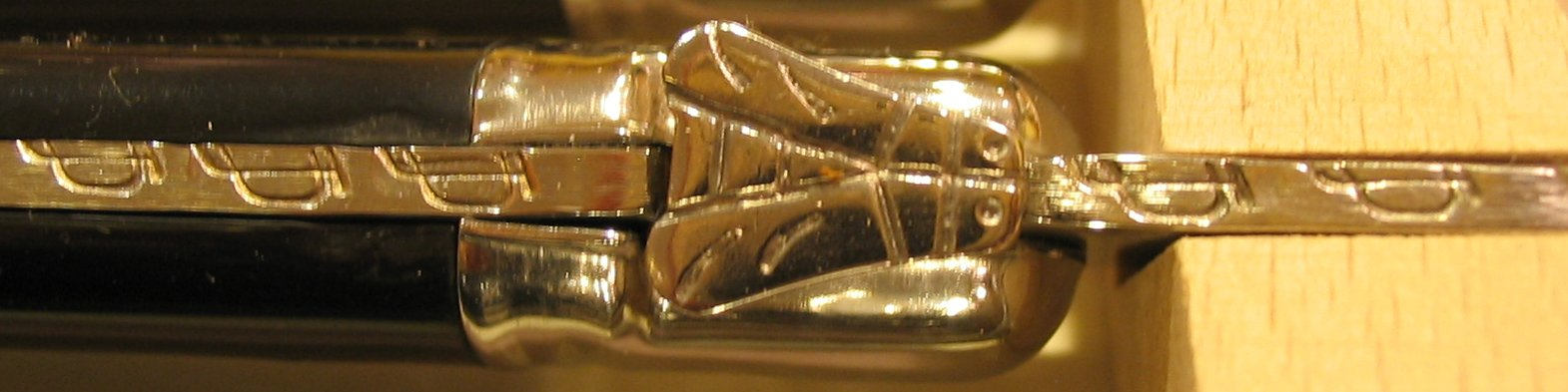
The 'bee' or 'fly' on the end of the backspring of laguiole knives

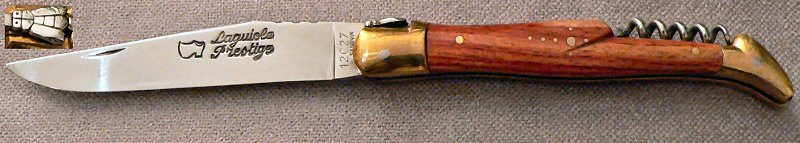
Modern Laguiole knife, with a corkscrew

Classic laguiole knives feature a slim, sinuous outline. They are about 12 cm long when closed, with a narrow, tapered blade of a semi-yataghan form, steel backspring (slipjoint) and a high quality of construction. Traditionally, the handle was made of cattle horn; however, nowadays other materials are sometimes used. These materials include French woods, exotic woods from all around the world, and fossilised mammoth ivory from Alaska or Siberia.

The French designer Philippe Starck re-designed laguiole knives using aluminium for the grips, but it was only a revival of a 1910 model. The blade is often made of stainless steel or high-carbon steel, with XC75 steels being 0.75% carbon and XC100 being 1% carbon.

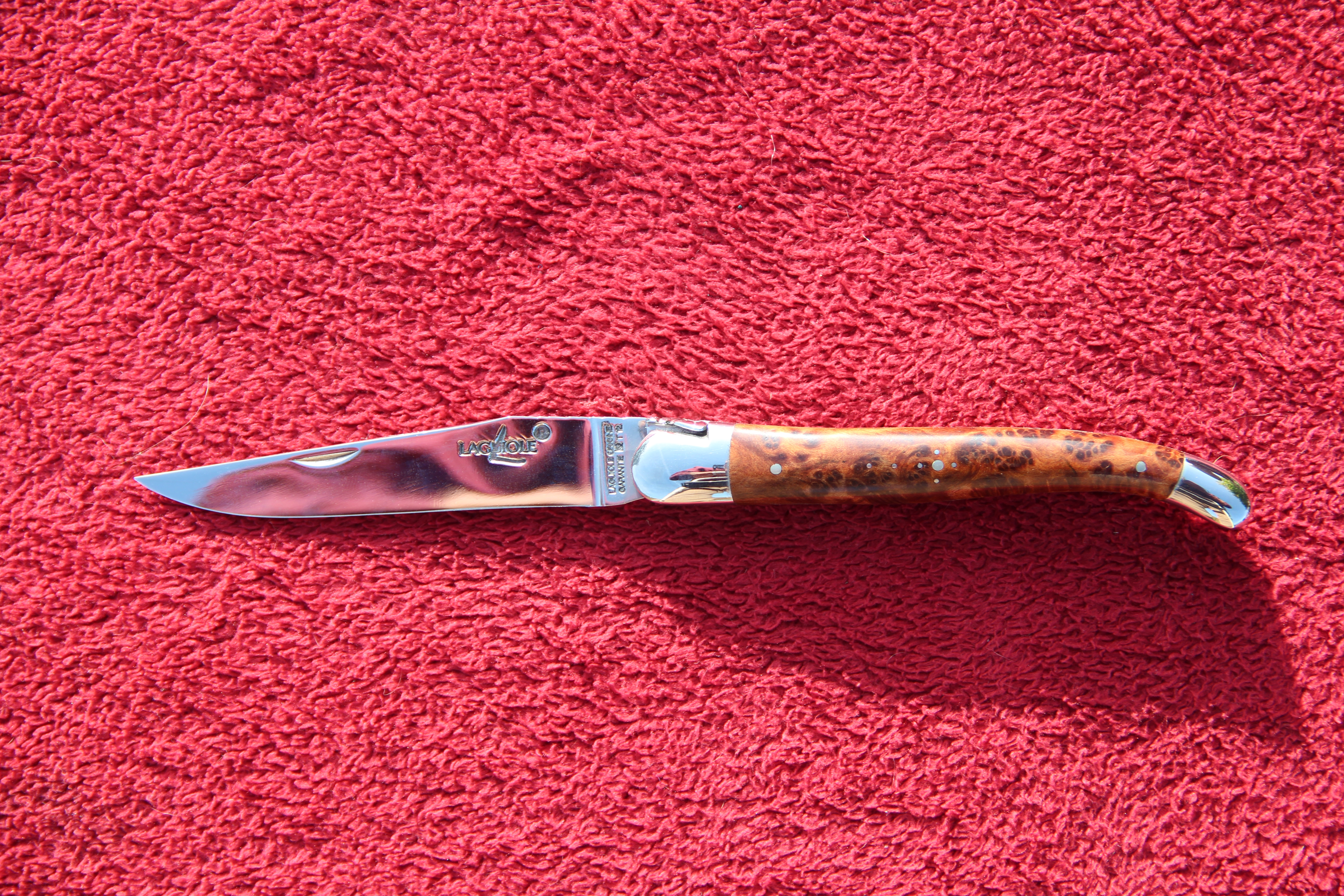
A genuine Laguiole knife made by the "Forge de Laguiole".

The traditional laguiole utilizes a single blade, but sometimes a corkscrew or some other implement is added. This necessitates an even slimmer cutaway handle, the shape of which is fancifully known as the "lady's leg", the bolster at the base resembling a foot. A 'Shepherd's Cross' consisting of 6–8 inlaid metal pins forming a cross can be found on the handle of some laguioles. It is a myth that this embellishment is a reference to a legend of Catholic shepherds in need of a cross for prayer during their seasonal migrations between the mountains and the plains. The cross can be found in the knives not earlier than the 1950s and is a mere decoration.

There is much mythology about the insect depicted on the spring. A legend identifies the design as a bee granted by Emperor Napoleon I (the bee was adopted as a dynastic symbol by Napoleon) in recognition of the courage of local soldiers. However, the "bee" on the laguiole knives was only introduced after World War II, more than a century after the death of the emperor. Technically, "la mouche" (the fly) is the end of the backspring, which sits over the rotating part of the blade. The upper section was expanded to form a thumb rest. Older laguiole knives feature many kinds of decorated springs which don't necessarily feature insects.

There are about 109 production steps for a one-piece laguiole (single blade), about 166 for a two-piece one (blade and one other tool), and about 216 for a three-piece model (blade and two tools – corkscrew and awl).

The name Laguiole has since been used as a trademark designation for various other implements, so that one can now buy, for example, a "Laguiole" corkscrew, spoon, or steak-knife set.

== French and overseas production ==
As laguiole designates a type of knife and is not a brand or trade name of cutlery, laguiole knives are manufactured globally. This has led to the widespread availability of inexpensive, and sometimes low-quality, "laguiole" knives from China and elsewhere. Laguiole knives from France are currently produced in the cutlery town of Thiers, and more recently, production resumed in the village of Laguiole, the knife's namesake. French manufacturers stamp a trademark or signature into the steel of their knives. A description of the type of steel used and "Made in France" will often be stamped as well.

== See also ==
- Opinel knives
- Douk-Douk
