= Penknife =

Small folding knife

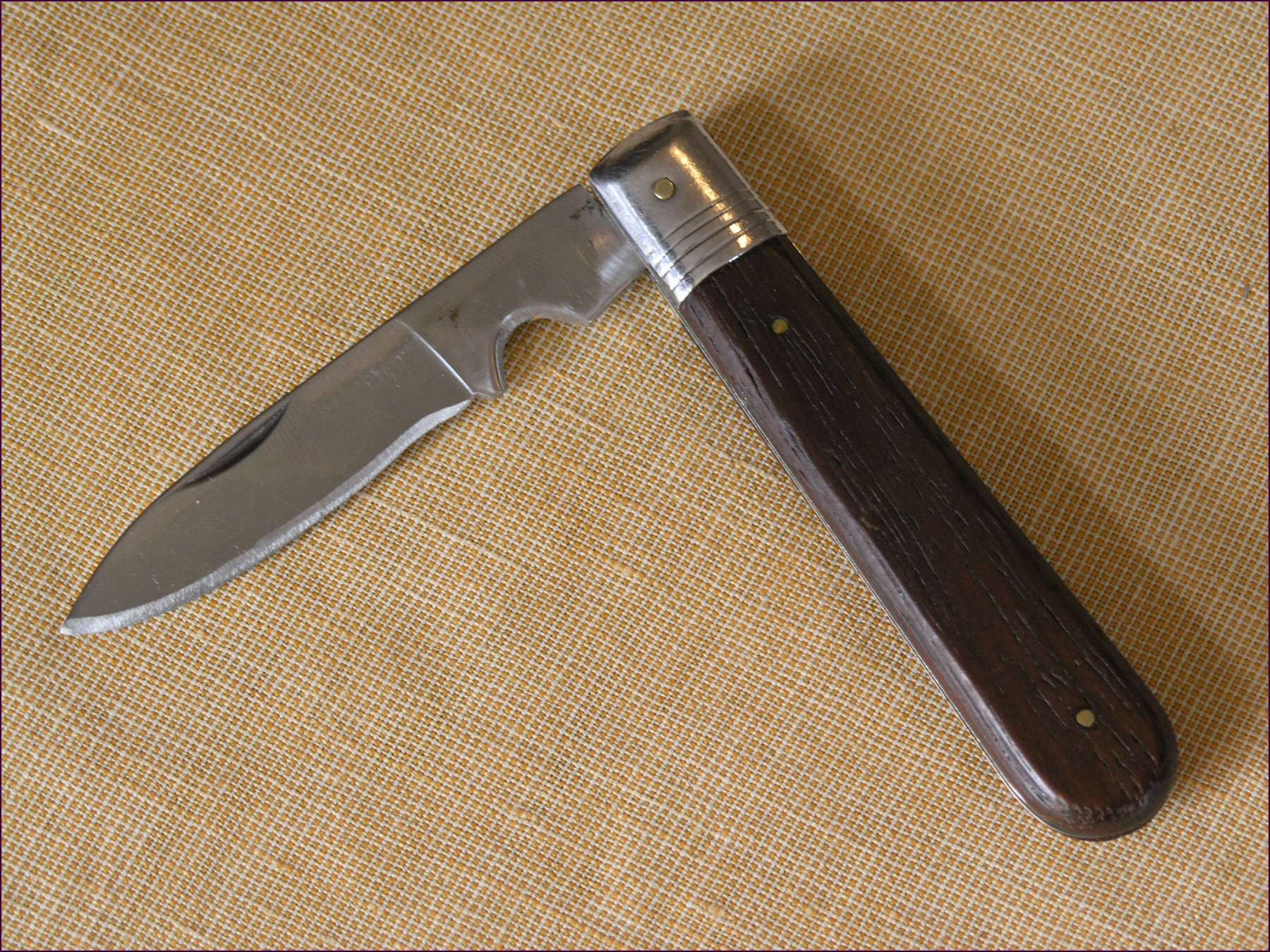
A simple penknife

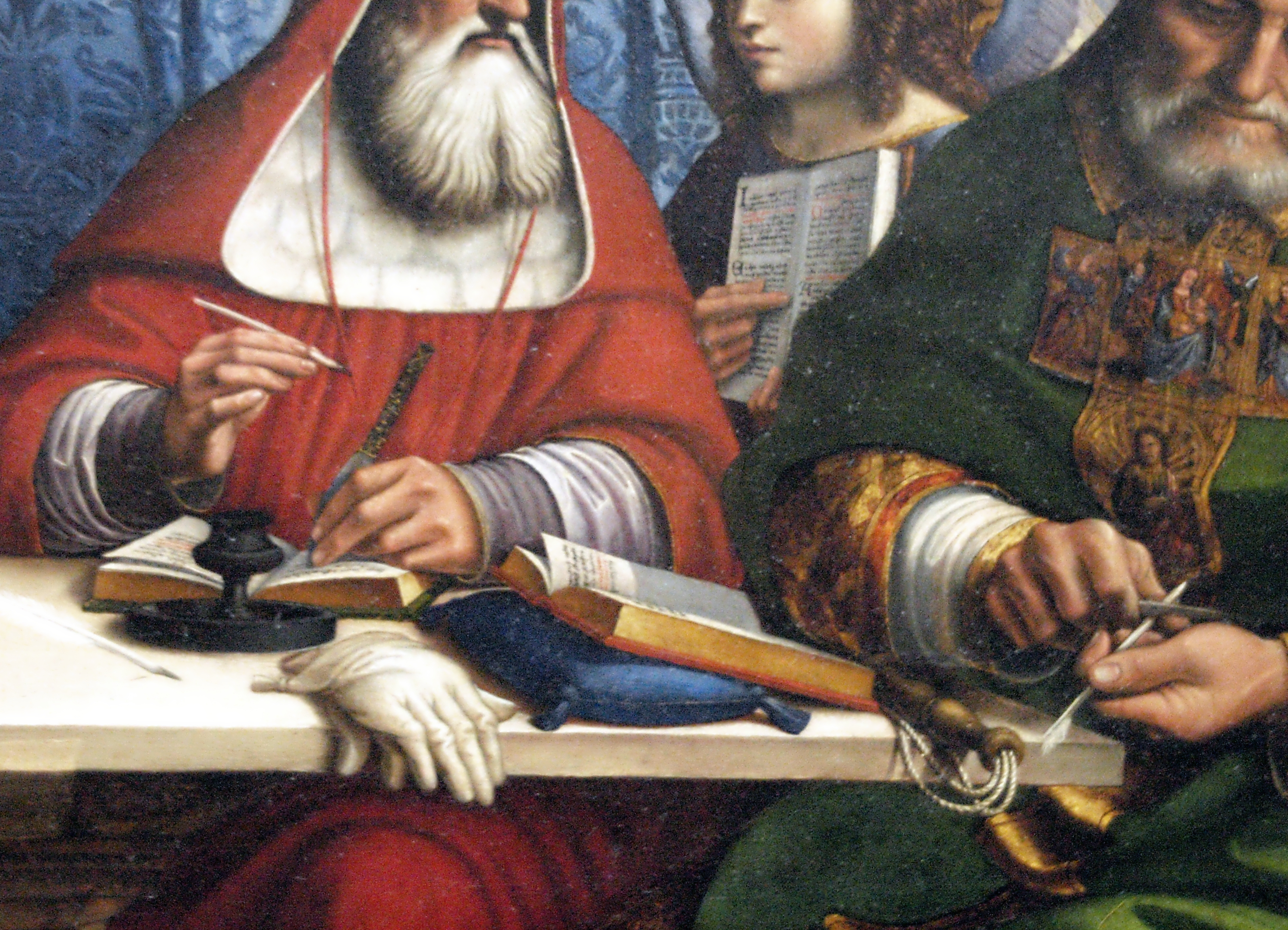
A 16th century depiction of using a penknife on a quill

A penknife, or pen knife, is a small folding knife. Today, penknife is also the common British English term for both a pocketknife, which can have single or multiple blades, and for multi-tools, with additional tools incorporated into the design.

== History ==
Originally, penknives were used for thinning and pointing quills (cf. penna, Latin for "feather") to prepare them for use as dip pens and, later, for repairing or re-pointing the nib. A penknife might also be used to sharpen a pencil, prior to the invention of the pencil sharpener. In the mid-1800s, penknives were necessary to slice the uncut edges of newspapers and books.

A penknife did not necessarily have a folding blade, but might resemble a scalpel or chisel by having a short, fixed blade at the end of a long handle.

During the 20th century there was a proliferation of multi-function pocketknives with assorted blades and gadgets, the most famous of which is the Swiss Army knife, referred to in British English as penknives.

A larger folding knife than a penknife, especially one in which the blade locks into place as a protection, as for skinning animals, is referred to by some as a claspknife.

== See also ==
- Opinel knife
- Penny knife
- Skeleton knife
