= Ratchet knife =

Ratchet knife in Jamaica is a general type of folding knife, generally German-made, considered easy to open quickly and associated with "rude boy" masculinity, the Okapi being a favourite brand. It is also used by the local Rastafari community to grind cannabis.
