= Skeleton knife =

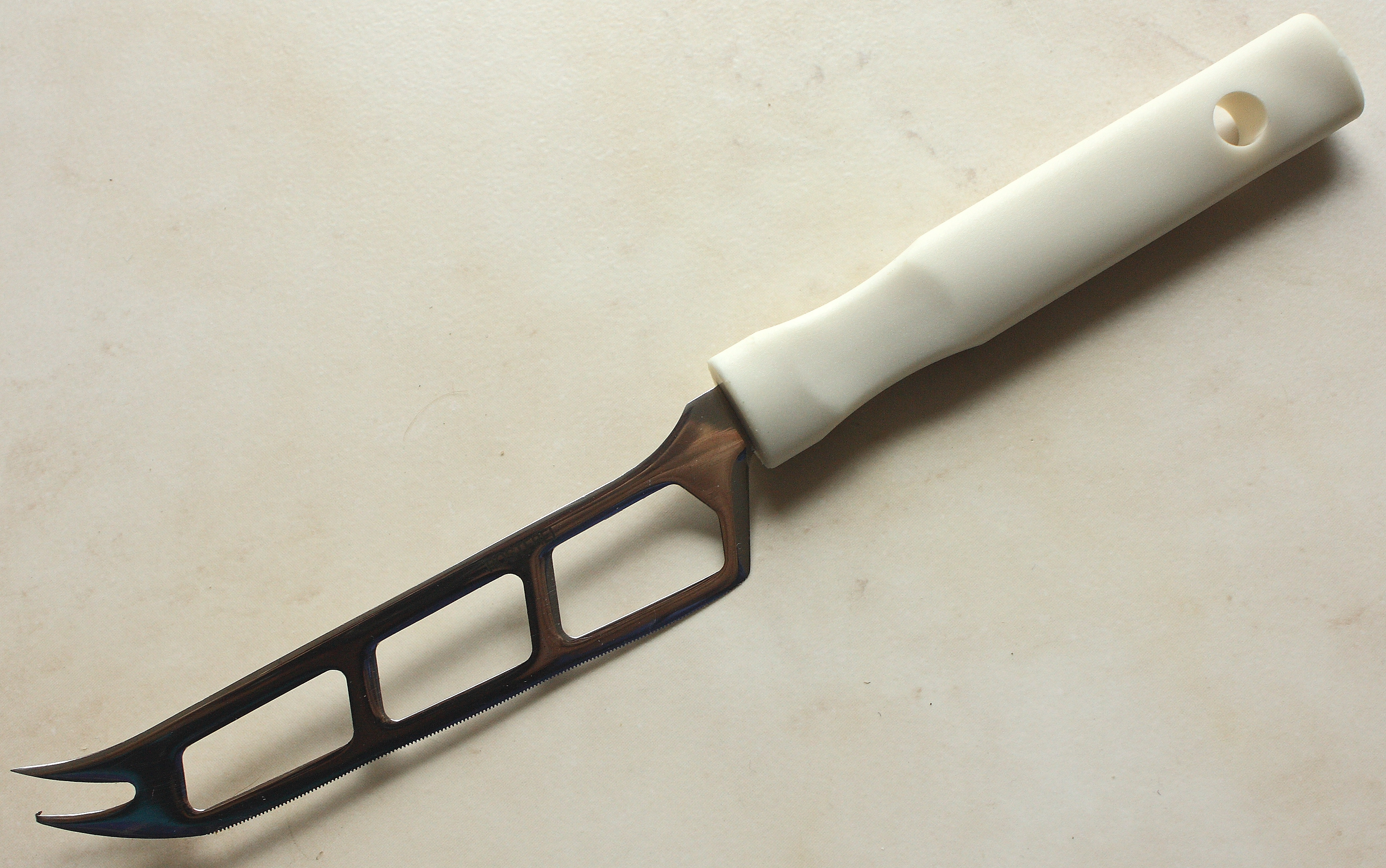
Cheese knife

A skeleton knife refers to two different types of knives, a kitchen knife and an unadorned penknife.

== Cheese knife ==
The first type of skeleton knife is a small kitchen knife that typically has three large holes on its blade used for cutting fruit or cheese. The purpose of these holes is to reduce the surface area of the blade so that sticky foods do not cling to it. Most skeleton knives are used for cutting very soft foods.

The knife was created by a Swiss restaurant and after its creation and advertisement it was copied by many cutlery companies and private manufacturers, and is now widely manufactured by companies like Victorinox.

== Penknife ==
The less commonly known type of skeleton knife is a penknife that was made without bolsters or handle material and sold to jewelers or other artisans for final finishing.

These types of knives were mostly made in the 19th century and as late as 1950. Wostenholm of Sheffield, England made many of these knives as did Imperial Knife Co. in the United States. Jewelers would finish the knives' handles in semi precious stones and in some cases gold or other precious metals in their own style.
