= Penny knife =

Type of utility knife

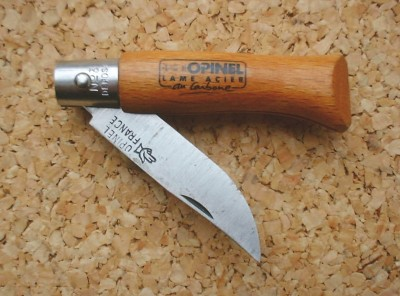
An Opinel No. 3 folding knife.

The penny knife was originally a simple 18th century utility knife with a fixed blade. It got its name because it cost 1 penny in England and the United States, towards the end of the 18th century.

The famous Fuller's Penny Knife helped gain the reputation of Sheffield, England cutlers in the pre-industrial era of the early 18th century.

The penny knife later evolved into a basic, mass-produced pocketknife with a folding blade, which pivoted freely in and out of the handle without a backspring or other device to hold it in position (other than the frictional pressures of the knife handle). This type of knife was popular with farmers in the United States, England, France, Italy, Portugal, and Spain for much of the 19th and part of the 20th century, and consequently is often called a farmer knife, sodbuster knife, or peasant knife.

In modern production, the smallest models of the Opinel, a late 19th-century peasant's knife, continue to use this basic design, consisting of a folding blade pivoting on an axle mounted through a steel-bolstered wooden handle.

== See also ==
- Penknife
- Higonokami
