= Higonokami =

Japanese folding knife

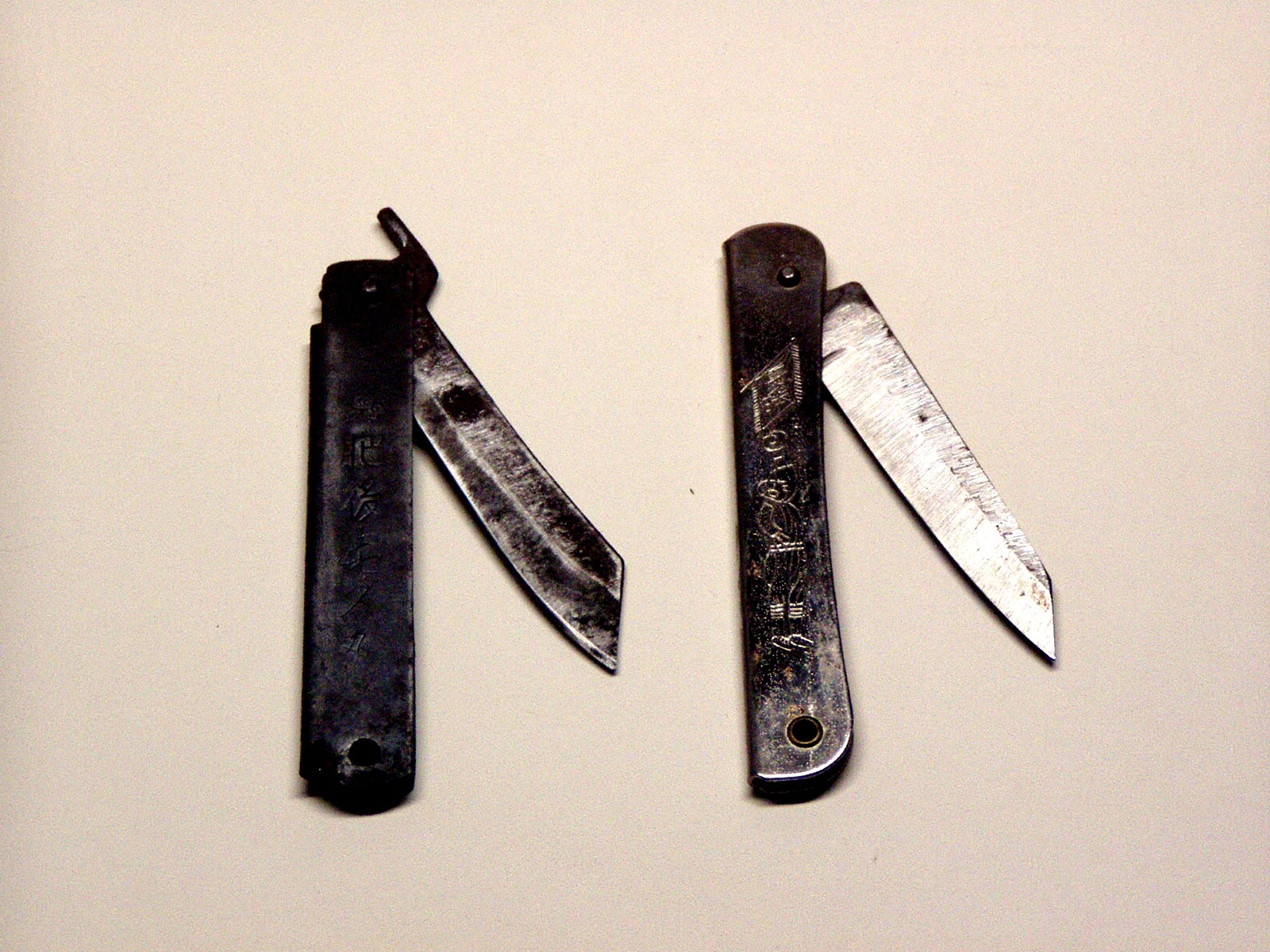
Higonokami knives

A higonokami (肥後守) is a type of folding pocket knife originating in Miki, Hyōgo Prefecture, Japan in 1896. The knife has no locking system, but is a friction folder or "penny knife", using the friction of the swivel or the pressure of the user's thumb on its iconic lever, or chikiri, to prevent the knife from folding during use. The handle of the higonokami is made of a folded-over sheet of metal. The handle is stamped with the name of the maker of the knife and the steel used in the blade. A distinguishing feature is that the blade has a flat grind without a secondary bevel.

== Etymology ==
The kanji used to spell higonokami (肥後守) in Japanese means "Governor of Higo". This was the most senior administrative position or kokushi who governed Higo (肥後国), an old province on the island of Kyūshū, which is now in present-day Kumamoto Prefecture. Within the Taihō Code, Kami (長官) was the highest of four titles of shitōkan (四等官) in the "four-ranked officials" system, the others being suke (次官), jō (判官), and sakan (主典). The shitōkan enforced the historical law system known as Ritsuryō. Kami can be spelled in numerous ways depending on the government agency; in the case of the Kokushi (国司, "Governor's Office"), the kanji is 守 which means "protector".

== History ==
The knife first appeared in 1896 as a result of smiths and metal workers struggling in post-samurai Japan following the major reforms made by Emperor Meiji in the late 19th century. With the abolition of the samurai class, the decline in demand for swords, especially after wearing them in public became illegal in 1876, required diversification into tools and knives. The pocketknives became very successful and popular in Japan. But sales went into decline after harsher knife legislation was enacted in Japan in 1961 following the fatal stabbing of Japanese politician Inejirō Asanuma as well as the attempt on then Prime Minister Nobusuke Kishi a year earlier, both by far-right activists.

The name "higonokami" is now trademarked by the Miki Custom Knife Guild in Miki City near Osaka, and it decides which brands can be associated with the name. However, only one fifth-generation manufacturer KaneKoma (from its Nagao Kanekoma Factory in Miki) is legally allowed to call its knives exclusively "higonokami". Other knifemakers of traditional style or modernized versions of higonokami must refer to their products as "Higo" or "Higonokami-style".
