= Okapi (knife) =

South African knife brand

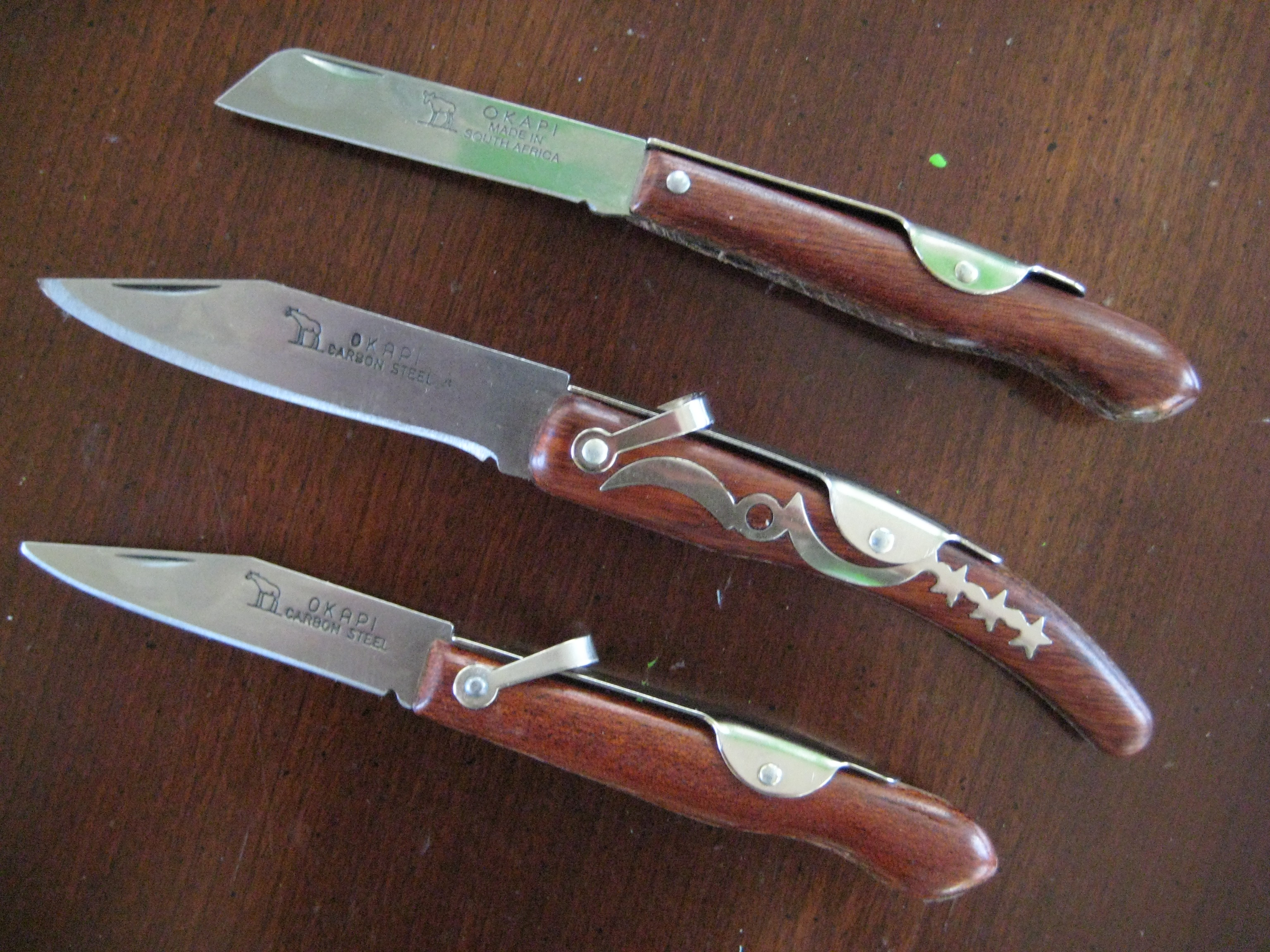
Three Okapi slipjoint knives

The Okapi is a ratchet-lock clasp or slipjoint knife originally produced in 1902 for export to Germany's colonies in Africa. The knife takes its name from the giraffe-like central African okapi.

Okapi knives are no longer produced in Germany; in 1988, Okapi South Africa (then trading as All Round Tooling) bought the trademark and tooling and began producing the Okapi line of knives in South Africa. The South African Okapi lockback knives are produced with carbon or stainless steel blades, with or without serrations. The most commonly found Okapi knives in Africa are made of resin impregnated wood (usually cherry) and the blades are made of 1055 carbon steel.

== Use ==
Okapi knives are mainly used by working-class people due to being very affordable and, while crude in appearance, are robust knives. Use can range from harvesting crops, self-defense, hunting, fishing, or general knife duty. Okapi knives are very popular in Southern Africa, but have a rather nefarious reputation as they are associated with criminals and street gangs. Due to the use of Okapis by criminals they have been nicknamed "the Saturday night special" of knives. In Jamaica, they are both a tool and one of the more favored of the "ratchet knives" carried by rude boys and are also known as the "3 star ratchet." Keith Richards of the Rolling Stones was known to carry for years a large Okapi lockback he was given in Jamaica.
