= X46Cr13 =

Martensitic stainless steel type

X46Cr13 is the European Norm name for a common martensitic stainless steel with the numeric name 1.4034. It is equivalent to American Iron and Steel Institute standard 420C (also known as 420HC). It has the highest carbon content of the SAE 420 series.

== Properties ==
X46Cr13 has good workability when hot, and potential to reach high hardness of up to 56 HRC. It contains a moderately high carbon ratio of approximately 0.46% which gives it a good compromise between high hardness and corrosion resistance for many applications. It is also relatively inexpensive to produce.

X46Cr13 is a basic steel without molybdenum, nitrogen or vanadium. It can be outperformed (typically at a higher cost) by more advanced steels like N680 with similar carbon content.

== Uses ==
Common uses include:

- knife blades,
- surgical instruments,
- bearings,
- valves and pumps,
- measuring devices
- spring wire.

It is also used in the manufacture of heat treated steel pipes used for CO_{2} carbon capture and storage.

A commercial variant of X46Cr13 with some Vanadium is known as 420HC and is used in the knife industry because of its ability to hold a superior edge.

An NHTSA recall was issued by Porsche for spherical joints utilized in 2003-2005 Porsche Carrera GT models due to long term intergranular corrosion.

== Standards ==
- EN numeric : 1.4034
- EN symbolic : X46Cr13
- Old AFNOR : Z40C13, Z44C14
- AISI : 420C
- ASTM : F899
- UNS : S 42000
- JIS : SUS420
- GOST : 40Ch13 ou 40X13
- PN : 4H13

== Composition ==
According to EN 10088.

- Carbon : 0.46 % (–0.03 / +0.04)
- Chromium : 13% (–0.5 / +0.5)
- Silicium < 1%
- Manganese < 1%
- Phosphorus < 0.04 %
- Sulfur < 0.03 %

== See also ==
- Steel grades
