= Pocketknife =

Folding knife that can be carried in a pocket

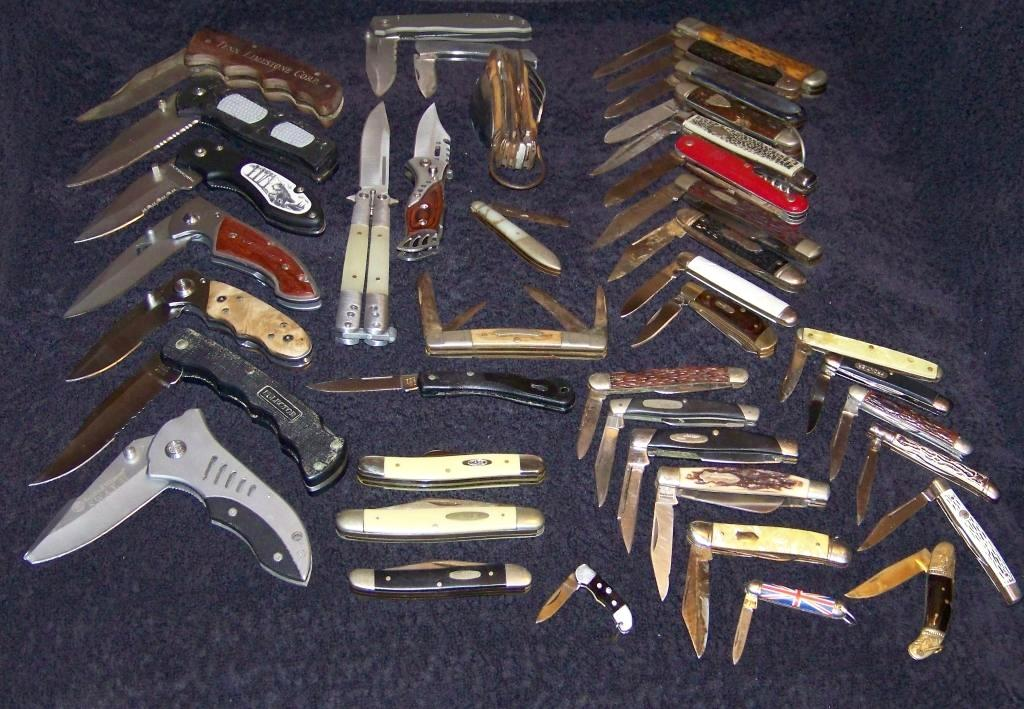
A collection of pocketknives

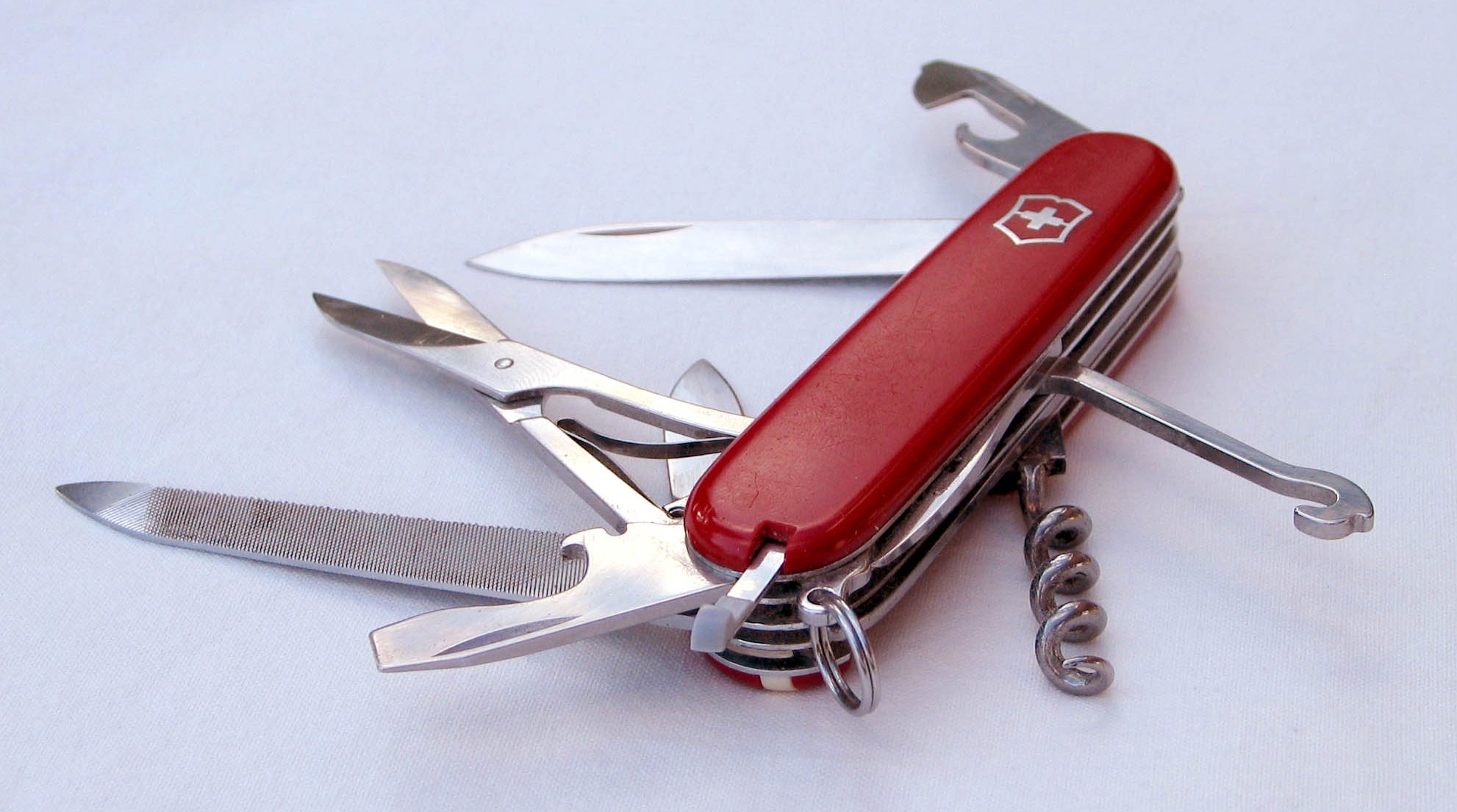
A Swiss Army knife made by Victorinox

A pocketknife (also spelled pocket knife) is a knife with one or more blades that fold into the handle. It is also known as a jackknife, or a folding knife. It may be referred to as a penknife, though a penknife may also be a specific kind of pocketknife. A typical blade length is 5 to 15 centimetres (2 to 6 in).

Pocketknives are versatile tools, and may be used for anything from whittling and woodcarving, to butchering small game, gutting and filleting small fish, aiding in the preparation of tinder and kindling for fires, boring holes in soft material, to opening an envelope, cutting twine, slicing fruits and vegetables or as a means of self-defense.

Pocketknives may also be used in conjunction with other tools and equipment for woodcraft and bushcraft.

A mushroom knife, with boar bristles on the back for cleaning mushrooms, and a curved blade for harvesting.

Specialised designs are also used for mushroom hunting and gardening. Pocketknives designed for gardening include pruning knives, which are folding knives with long curved blades used for pruning, trimming cuttings, taking buds and preparing material for grafting.

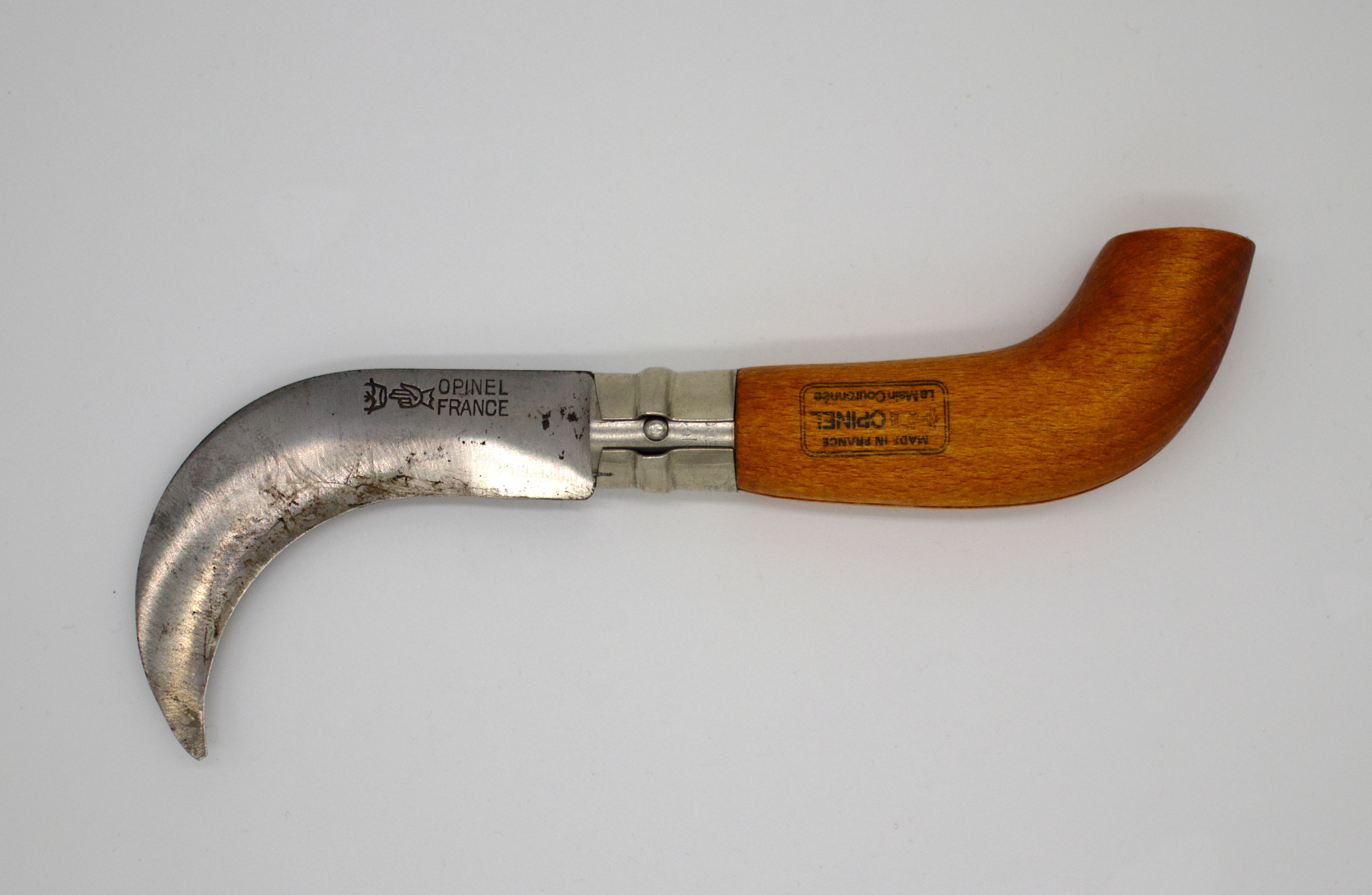
A typical pruning knife, made by Opinel

== History ==
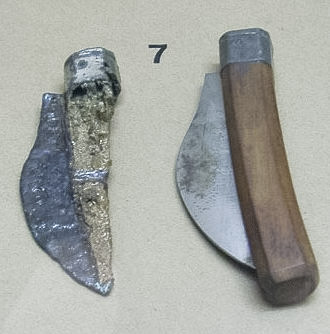
Roman pocketknife: original with a modern reconstruction beside it

The earliest known pocketknives date to at least the early Iron Age. A pocketknife with a bone handle was found at the Hallstatt Culture type site in Austria, dating to around 600–500 BCE. Iberian folding-blade knives made by indigenous artisans and craftsmen and dating to the pre-Roman era have been found in Spain. Many folding knives from the Viking Age have been found. They carried some friction binders, but more often they seem to have used folding knives that used a closure to keep the blade open.

== Peasant knife ==
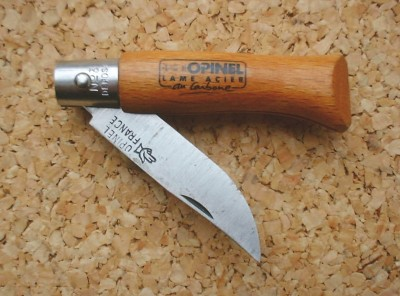
Smaller Opinels are a type of peasant knife

The peasant knife, farmer knife, or penny knife is the original and most basic design of a folding pocketknife, using a simple pivoted blade that folds in and out of the handle freely, without a backspring, slipjoint, or blade locking mechanism. The first peasant knives date to the pre-Roman era, but were not widely distributed nor affordable by most people until the advent of limited production of such knives in cutlery centers such as Sheffield, England commencing around 1650, with large-scale production starting around the year 1700 with models such as Fuller's Penny Knife and the Wharncliffe Knife. Some peasant knives used a bolster or tensioning screw at the blade to apply friction to the blade tang in order to keep the blade in the open position. The smallest (Nos. 2–5) Opinel knives are an example of the peasant knife. The knife's low cost made it a favorite of small farmers, herdsmen, and gardeners in Europe and the Americas during the late 19th and early 20th century.

== Slip joint knife ==
Most pocketknives for light duty are slipjoints. This means that the blade does not lock but, once opened, is held in place by tension from a flat bar or leaf-type backspring that allows the blade to fold if a certain amount of pressure is applied. The first spring-back knives were developed around 1660 in England, but were not widely available until the Industrial Revolution and development of machinery capable of mass production. Many locking knives have only one blade that is as large as can be fitted into the handle, because the locking mechanism relies on a spring-loaded latch built into the spine or frame of the handle to lock it and it is difficult to build in multiple levers, one for each blade. Slipjoints tend to be smaller than other typical pocketknives.

Some popular patterns of slipjoint knives include:

Pattern	Description	Image
Barlow	The Barlow knife has a characteristically long bolster, an elongated oval handle, and one or two blades. It is assumed to have been named after its inventor, although there is some dispute as to which Barlow this actually was. First produced in Sheffield, England, the Barlow knife became popular in America in beginning of the nineteenth century.	Case Damascus Barlow Knife
Camper or Scout	The traditional camper or scout knife has four tools: a large drop point blade along with a can opener, combination cap lifter/slotted screwdriver, and an awl or punch. Many other combinations of large and small drop point blades, a Phillips-head screwdriver, saw, etc. are also considered camper/scout knives.	Victorinox Soldier, a Camper or Scout pattern pocketknife
Canoe	The canoe knife is shaped somewhat like a native American canoe and typically has two drop-point blades.	A canoe knife
Congress	The congress knife has a convex front with a straight or shallow concave back. It usually carries four blades.	A congress knife
Cotton Sampler	Longish handle compared to single shorter blade. Blade is scalpel shaped with a belly. Bolster on blade end only. Lanyard hole makes hand carrying easier for frequent field use.	Cotton Sampler
Dog Bone	Double bolstered handle with a blade opening from each end. The blade is symmetrical, with roughly parallel sides.	
Dog Leg	A double bolstered handle with a significant cant, resembling the shape of a dog's hind leg. Can have one or two blades that open from the same end.	
Elephant's toenail	The elephant's toenail is a large design similar to the sunfish but usually tapers on one end giving it the "elephant's toenail" shape. These knives, like the sunfish, usually have two wide blades.	
Hawkbill	Technically a blade type (resembling a hawk's bill, with a concave sharpened edge and a dull convex edge), but also a traditional single-bladed slip joint knife with a single bolster on the blade end, and a teardrop-shaped handle.	
Hobo	a traditional folding pocketknife similar to a Camper, that incorporates a knife blade, a fork, and a spoon into one versatile eating utensil. Many feature a detachable design, allowing the user to separate the pieces so they can be used simultaneously as a fork and knife	
Lady Leg	Drop point blade paired with a clip point blade, with a handle shaped like a lower leg with a high-heeled shoe, which forms a functional bottle opener.	
Marlinspike	A single sheepsfoot or hawkbill blade, with a large marlinspike, to assist in untangling knots or unravelling rope for splicing on the opposing side.	Slip joint knife with marlinspike
Melon Tester	Single long and narrow drop point blade, used for taking a sample from watermelon.	
Muskrat	Two narrow clip point blades, one from each end, with double bolsters.	
Peanut	A smaller knife with a clip point and drop point from the same end, double bolsters on a slightly wavy handle.	A W.R. Case "Peanut" model with clip and spey blades
Penknife	The penknife was originally intended to sharpen quill pens, but continues to be used because of its suitability for fine or delicate work. A penknife generally has one or two pen blades, and does not interfere with the appearance of dress clothes when carried in the pocket.	Buck Two-Bladed Pen Knife. Primary Blade Two Inches
Sodbuster	The sodbuster or Hippekniep or Notschlachtmesser (sometimes also called the Farmer) has a simple handle with no bolster and only one blade. It is an economic design, usually with wood or celluloid scales, lacking metal bolsters.	Herder Hippekniep
Sow Belly	Has a handle with deeply bowed "belly", similar to a stockman, but more pronounced. It may have a single clip point blade, or a sheepsfoot and clip point blade opposite a shorter spey blade.	Case Sow Belly with three blades
Stockman	The stockman has a clip, a sheep's foot and a spey blade. They are usually middle-sized. There are straight handled and sowbelly versions.	A medium stockman knife
Sunfish	The sunfish is a large design with a straight handle and two bolsters. The blades are usually short (less than 3 inches (76 mm)), but both the handle and blades are very wide. Sunfish knives usually have two blades.	A small sunfish knife
Toothpick	Elongated knife, with a single narrow clip point blade. Handle has bolsters at both ends, and is turned up or tapered on the opposite end from the blade. Variations include oversized versions called Arkansas or Texas Toothpicks, and miniaturized version, called a Baby Toothpick.	A Toothpick knife
Trapper	The trapper is larger knife with a clip and a spey blade. The blades are usually hinged at the same end (that is to say, it is a jack-knife).	A Case Trapper knife with stag scales
Whittler	The whittler is a type of pen knife with three blades, the master blade bearing on two springs.	Splitback Whittler

=== Multi-tool knives ===
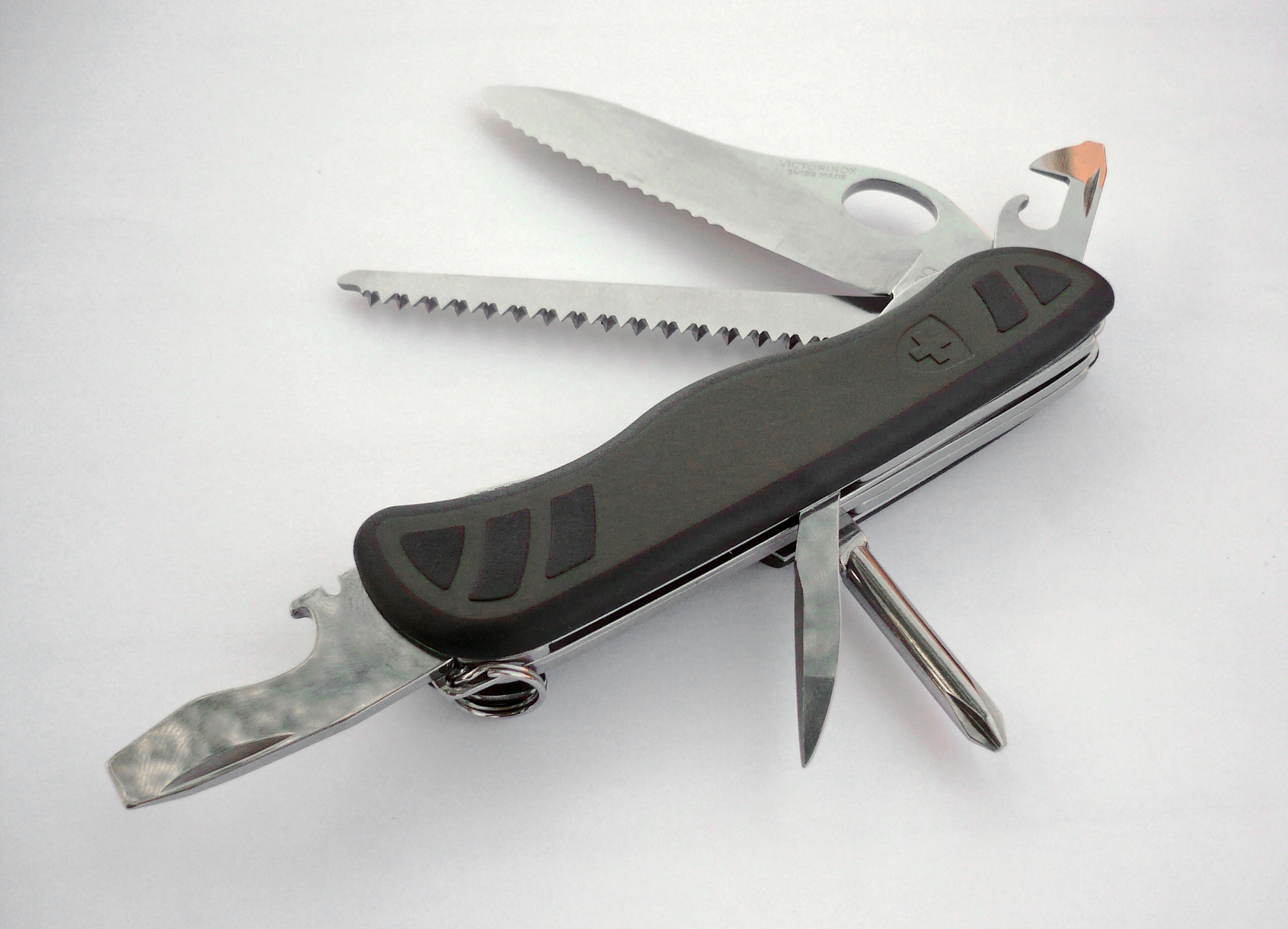
Soldatenmesser 08, the multi-tool knife issued to the Swiss Armed Forces since 2008

The multi-tool knife market was formerly dominated by variations on the American camper style or the Swiss Army knives manufactured by Victorinox and Wenger. Various new styles, sizes, and tool presentation concepts have since been introduced, such as the Leatherman "pocket survival tool" concept introduced in 1983. These new varieties often incorporate a pair of pliers and other tools in conjunction with one or more knife blade styles, either locking or nonlocking.

After encountering difficulty with increased security restrictions following the September 11 attacks in 2001, Wenger encountered difficulties and was bought out by Victorinox in 2005.

Multitool knives often have more than one blade, including an assortment of knife blade edges (serrated, plain, saws) as well as a selection of other tools such as bottle openers, corkscrews, and scissors. Variations of the Swiss Army knife have featured large tool selections. These knives are produced by Victorinox and are issued to military services and sold to the public. Similar to the Swiss Army knife is the German Army knife, with two blades opening from each side and featuring hard plastic grips and aluminum liners. The U.S. Military utility knife (MIL-K-818), issued by the United States Army, Navy, and Marine Corps, was made for many years by the Camillus Cutlery Company and Imperial Schrade as well as many other companies. It was originally produced with carbon steel blades and brass liners (both vulnerable to corrosion), but with the onset of the Vietnam War was modified to incorporate all-stainless steel construction. The current-issue U.S. military utility knife has textured stainless grips and four stainless blades/tools opening on both sides in the camper or scout pattern and has an extremely large clevis or bail. The Victorinox Swiss Army Soldier Knife has been issued a National Stock Number (NSN) to be authorized for issue to US service members. This is the first time a US military issued utility/pocket knife that was not manufactured in the United States has been adopted.

=== Miscellaneous designs ===
Another style of folding, non-locking knife is the friction-folder. These use simple friction between the blade and scales to hold the blade in place once opened; an example is the Japanese higonokami.

An electrician's knife typically has slip joint screwdriver and knife blades with a thumb tab to lock the screwdriver blade. The two-blade Camillus Electrician's knife (the US military version is known as a TL-29) was the inspiration for the development of the linerlock.

A credit card knife is usually a very thin knife that is the shape and size of a credit card, either when folded into a knife shape or unfolded for storage. It is designed to be carried in a wallet along with regular credit cards. Some credit card knives can contain other small tools, such as tweezers, or toothpicks.

A ballpoint pen knife is generally a pen with a concealed knife inside, which can be used as a letter opener or as a self-defense weapon.

== Lock-blade knives ==
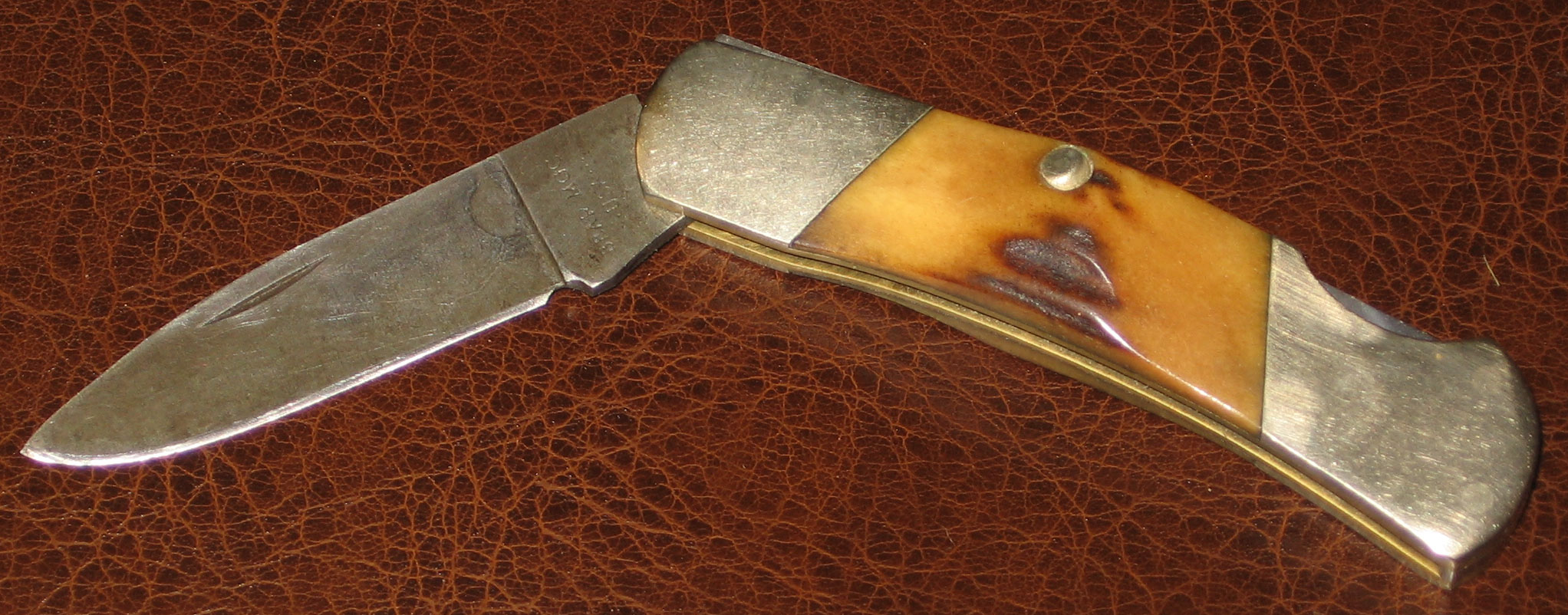
Medium-sized lockback knife with deer-antler grips, nickel-silver bolsters and brass liners

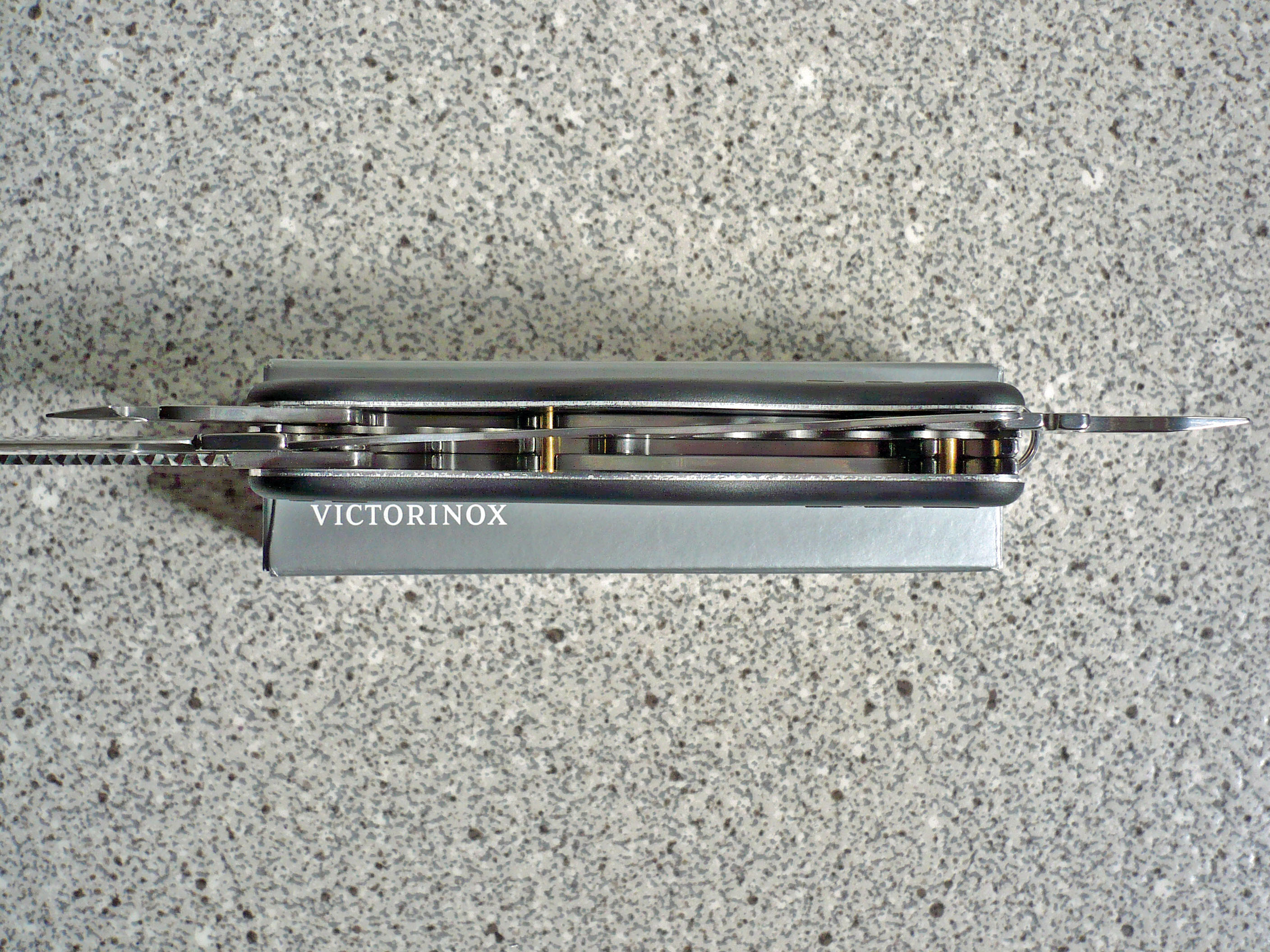
Dual liner lock system as used in the Soldatenmesser 08 and various other Victorinox 111 mm models

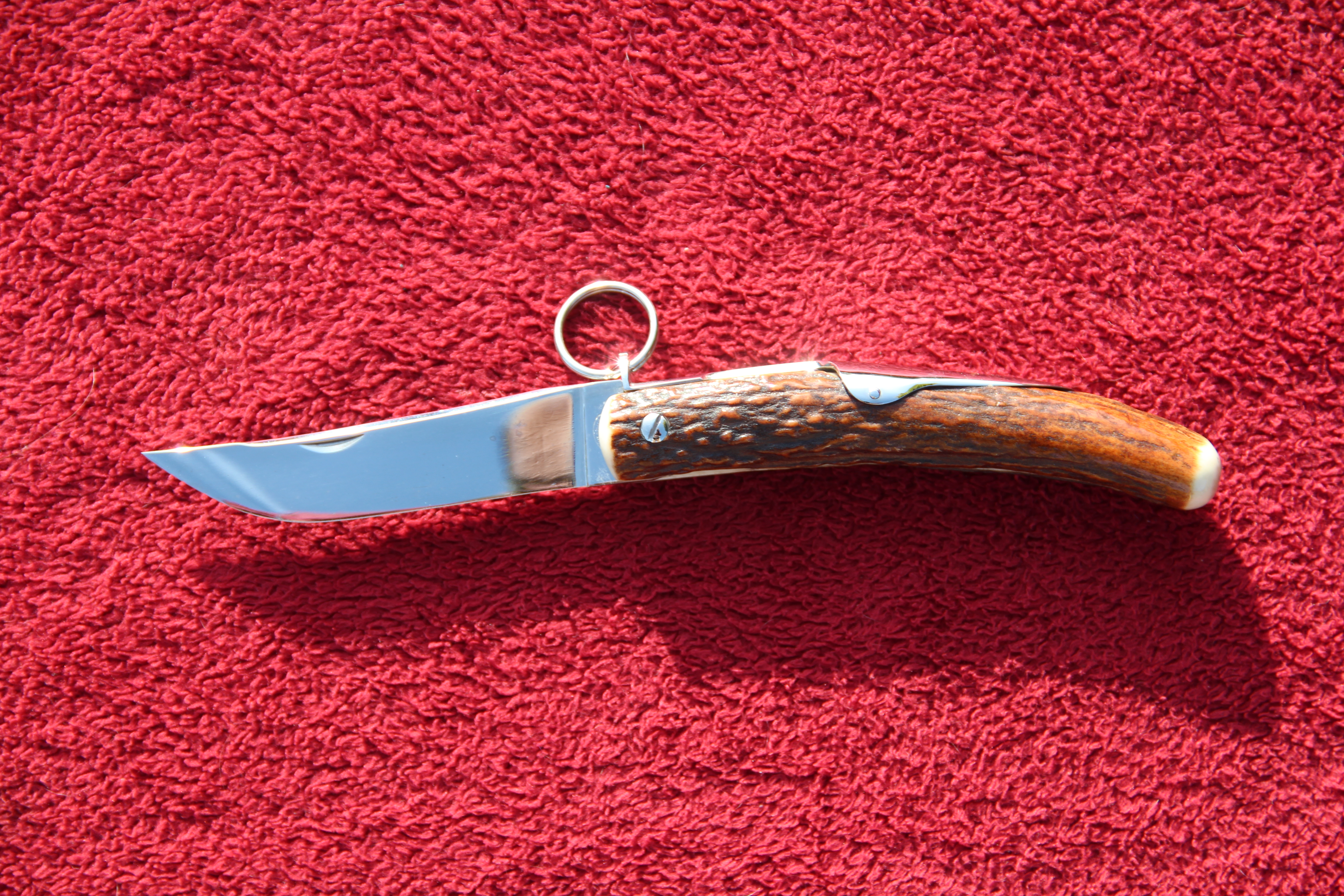
Pocket knife “Yatagan” with backspring made by the Mongin cutlery in Biesles (Haute-Marne).

Knives with locking blades, often referred to as lock-blade knives or clasp knives, have a locking mechanism that locks the blade into its fully opened position. This lock must be released in a distinct action before the knife can be folded. The lock-blade knife improves safety by preventing accidental blade closure while cutting. It is this locking blade feature that differentiates the lock-blade knife from either the peasant knife or the slipjoint spring-back knife. Locking knives also tend to be larger: it is easier to fit a lock into a larger frame, and larger knives are more likely to be used for more forceful kinds of work. The cost of a locking mechanism is also proportionally less than it would be on a smaller, and generally cheaper, knife.

Lock-blade knives have been dated to the 15th century. In Spain, one early lock-blade design was the Andalusian clasp knife popularly referred to as the navaja. Opinel knives use a twist lock, consisting of a metal ferrule or barrel ring that is rotated to lock the blade either open or closed. In the late 20th century lock-blade pocketknives were popularized and marketed on a wider scale. Companies such as Buck Knives, Camillus, Case, and Gerber, created a wide range of products with locks of various types. The most popular form, the lockback knife, was popularized by Buck Knives in the 1960s, so much that the eponymous term "buck knife" was used to refer to lockback knives that were not manufactured by Buck.

The lockback's blade locking mechanism is a refinement of the slipjoint design; both use a strong backspring located along the back of the knife handle. However, the lockback design incorporates a hook or lug on the backspring, which snaps into a corresponding notch on the blade's heel when the blade is fully opened, locking the blade into position. Closing the blade requires the user to apply pressure to the spring-loaded bar located towards the rear of the knife handle to disengage the hook from the notch and thus release the blade.

The Walker Linerlock, invented by knifemaker Michael Walker, and the framelock came to prominence in the 1980s. In both designs the liner inside the knife is spring-loaded to engage the rear of the blade when open and thus hold it in place. In the case of the framelock, the liner is the handle, itself. The Swiss Army knife product range has adopted dual linerlocks on their 111 mm models. Some models feature additional "positive" locks, which essentially ensure that the blade cannot close accidentally. CRKT has patented an "Auto-LAWKS" device, which features a second sliding switch on the hilt. It can operate as any linerlock knife if so desired, but if the user slides the second control up after opening, it places a wedge between the linerlock and the frame, preventing the lock from disengaging until the second device is disabled.

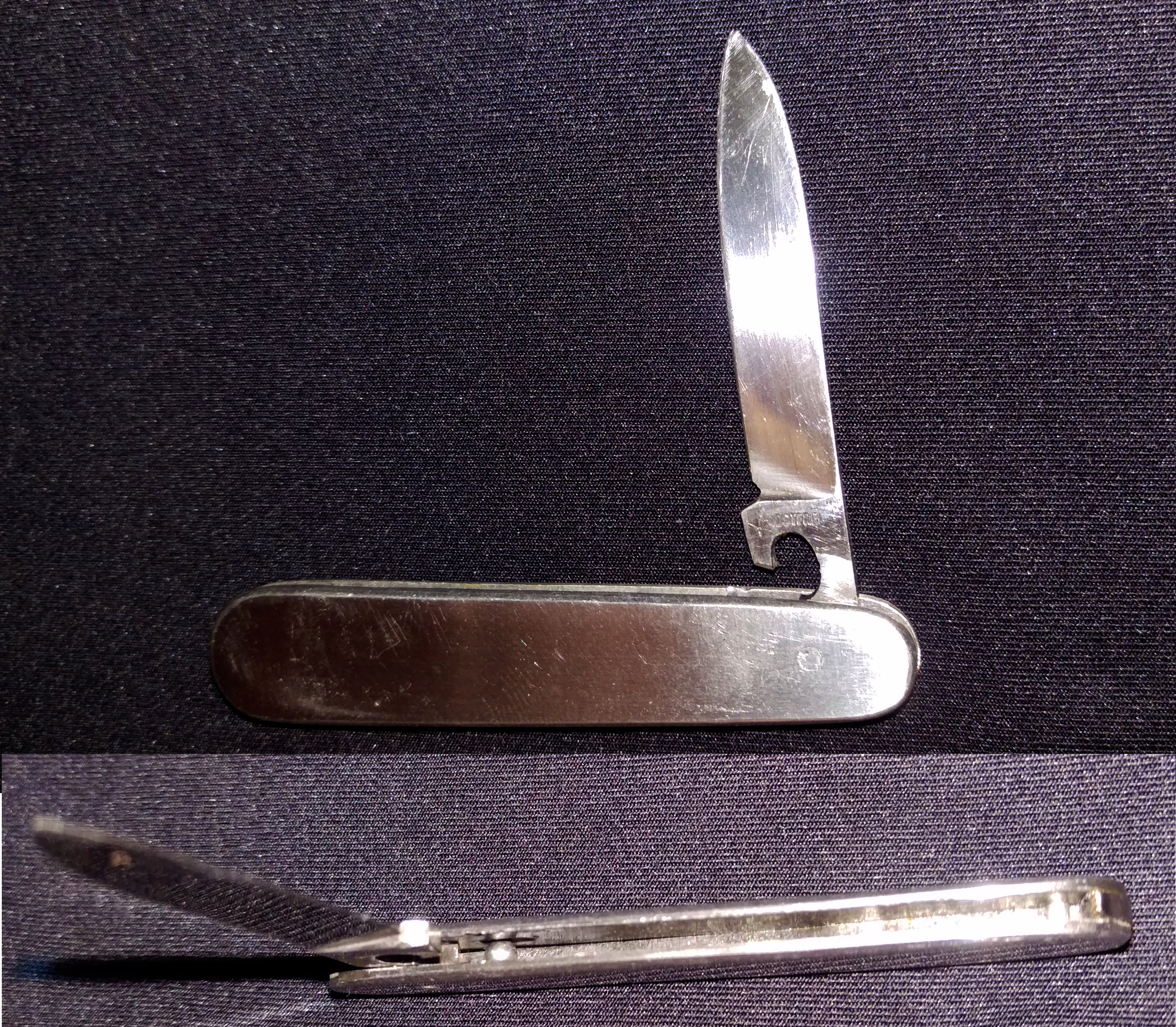
Gravity lock ball bearing pocketknife

A gravity knife locks the blade by dropping a ball bearing into a groove. The knife has to be positioned with the tip upward to release the ball bearing, and positioned tip down to lock. Due to the rapid deployment of the blade, gravity knives are often classed as switchblades and are illegal in jurisdictions that outlaw the latter.

=== Tactical folding knife ===
Buck's original lockback knife was originally marketed as a "folding hunting knife" and while it became popular with sportsmen, it saw use with military personnel as it could perform a variety of tasks. Custom knife makers began making similar knives, in particular was knifemaker Bob Terzuola. Terzuola is credited with coining the phrase "Tactical Folder".

In the early 1990s, tactical folding knives became popular in the U.S.A. The trend began with custom knifemakers such as Bob Terzuola, Michael Walker, Allen Elishewitz, Mel Pardue, Ernest Emerson, Ken Onion, Chris Reeve, Rick Hinderer, Warren Thomas, and Warren Osbourne. These knives were most commonly built as linerlocks. Blade lengths varied from 3 to 12 inches (76 to 305 mm), but the most typical models never exceeded 4 inches (100 mm) in blade length for legal reasons in most US jurisdictions.

In response to the demand for these knives, production companies offer mass-produced tactical folding knives. Companies such as Benchmade, Kershaw Knives, Buck Knives, Gerber Legendary Blades, CRKT, Spyderco and Cold Steel collaborated with tactical knifemakers, in some cases retaining them as full-time designers. Tactical knifemakers such as Ernest Emerson and Chris Reeve opened their own mass-production factories.

There has been criticism of companies marketing folding knives as weapons rather than tools. Many who have studied knife fighting point out that even the strongest locking mechanisms have some risk of failure, so a folding knife is never going to be as reliable as a fixed-blade combat knife. Lynn Thompson, martial artist and CEO of Cold Steel, said in an article in Black Belt magazine that most tactical folding knives are too short to be of much use in a knife fight, despite his company marketing a tactical folder.

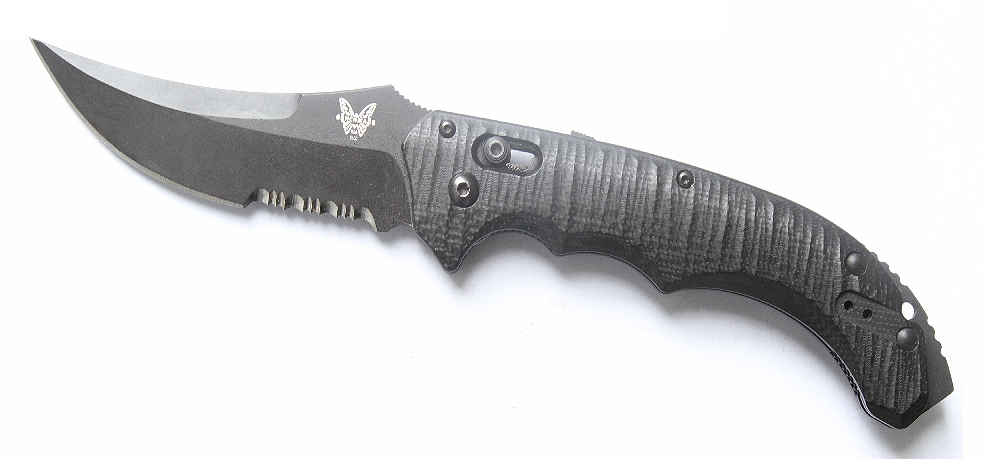
Benchmade Bedlam auto-knife

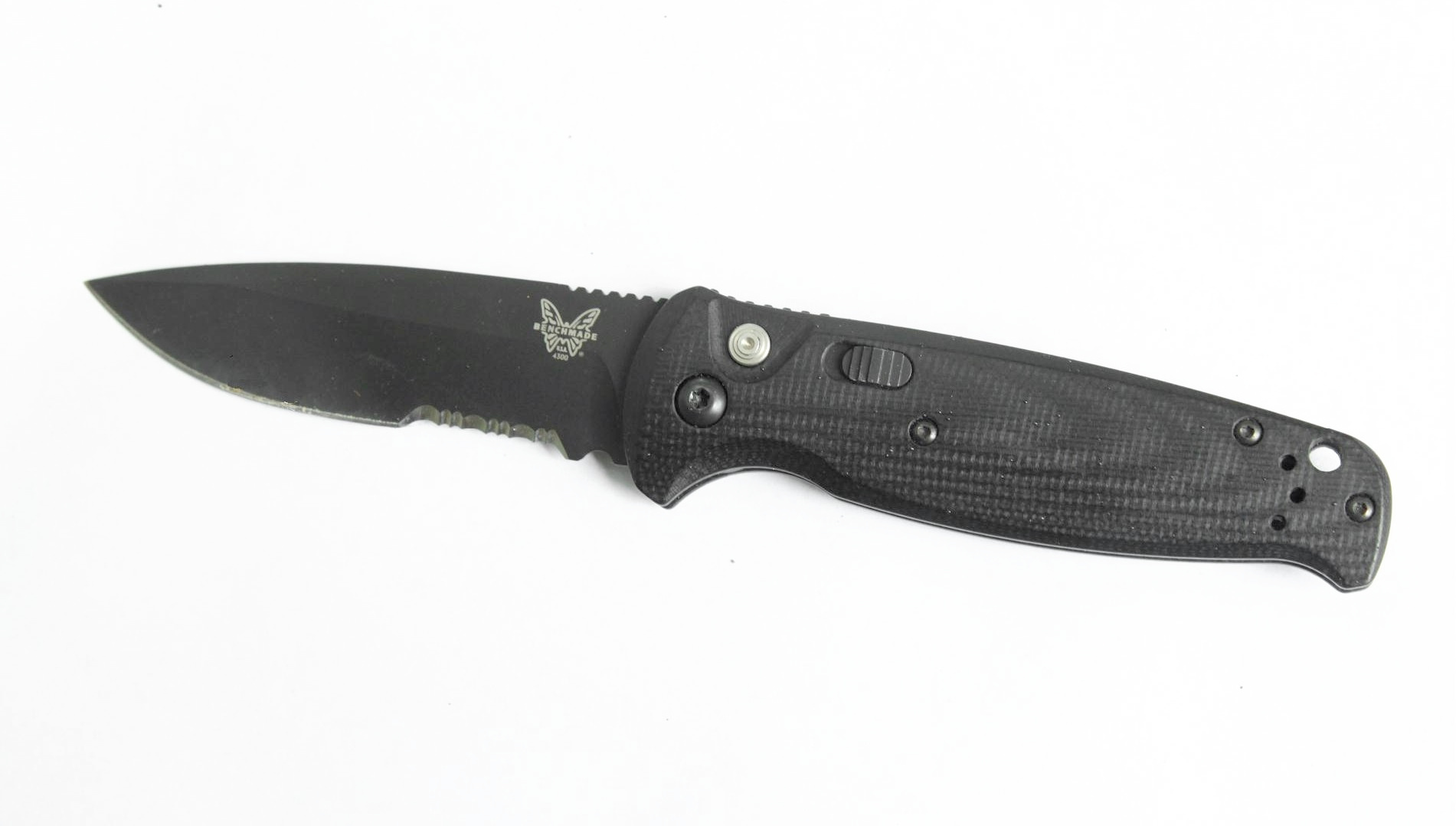
Benchmade 4300 CLA Composite Lite Auto. Auto knife push button operation with side mounted safety, reversible clip. Length 7.85- inches Blade length 3.4 inches. Blade Material CM154.

== Other features ==
Traditional folding knives are opened using a "nail nick", or slot where the user can grasp the blade with a fingernail to open the blade. This is somewhat cumbersome and requires use of two hands, leading to several innovations. The thumb stud is a projection on both sides of the blade that allows for one-handed opening with thumb pressure on the projection. The thumb hole, a Spyderco patent, requires the user to press the pad of the thumb against a hole and open the blade by rotating the thumb similarly to using the thumb-stud.

Another innovation of Sal Glesser, Spyderco's founder, was the pocket clip, which he named a "Clip-it". Clips are metal or plastic and similar to the clips found on ballpoint pens. These allow the knife to clip to a pocket, keeping it lint-free and out of the way of other pocket items such as coins. Assisted opening systems have been pioneered by makers like Ken Onion with his "Speed-Safe" mechanism and Ernest Emerson's Wave system, wherein a hook catches the user's pocket and the blade is opened on withdrawal.

One of the first one handed devices was the automatic spring release, also known as a switchblade. An innovation to pocketknives made possible by the thumb-stud is the replaceable blade insert developed in 1999 by Steven Overholt (U.S. Patent no. 6,574,868), originally marketed by TigerSharp Technologies and as of 2007 by Clauss. Some systems are a combination of assisted opening and a thumb stud. CRKT knives designed by Harold "Kit" Carson often incorporate a "Carson Flipper", which is a small protrusion on the rear of the blade that protrudes from the obverse side of the handle when closed. A flick of the finger (often in combination with a flick of the wrist) can open the blade quickly. Once open, the protrusion is between the blade edge and the user's index finger, serving as a guard against self injury. Some designs feature a second protrusion on the opposite side of the blade, forming a full cross guard such as on a fixed blade knife. These "flippers" are found on other brands of knives as well, such as Kershaw 1306bw and cheaper knives including certain versions of Imperial Schrade's Snowblind tactical folders, and others.

== Legal issues ==
Pocketknives are legal to own in most countries, but may face legal restrictions on their use. While pocketknives are almost always designed as tools, they do have the potential to be considered by legal authorities as weapons.

=== United Kingdom ===
It is illegal to carry a folding knife having a blade with a cutting edge of more than 3 inches (just over 7.6 cm) in length in public without "good reason". The terms "in public" and "good reason" are not defined, but examples of "religious duty", "national dress" and "requirement of employment or hobby" are given. It is left up to a police officer's individual subjective discretion, and ultimately a magistrate to decide if a knife is being carried "in public", and for a "good reason". Folding knives with blades of 3 inches (76 mm) or less may be carried without needing to provide "good reason" so long as the blade is not capable of being locked in the open position. However, it is illegal to have the intention of using any object in public as a weapon, meaning that even a knife that is legal to carry without needing "good reason" may still be found to be illegal if the police officer has grounds to suspect it will be used as a weapon. The onus lies on the officer to prove that intent. Recent court decisions in the UK have made it easier for public prosecutors to obtain knife possession convictions by preventing the accused from citing self-defence or even fear of attack as a justifiable reason for carrying a knife. The UK government advisory website on crime and justice formerly stated that "even if you carry a knife to protect yourself or make yourself feel safer but don’t intend to use it then you are committing a crime."

=== United States ===
Knives are regulated by federal, state and municipal laws. Some jurisdictions prohibit the possession or use of pocketknives that feature locking blades. Others prohibit certain blade styles perceived by law enforcement and legal authorities as optimal for offensive fighting, transforming the pocketknife from a utility tool into a deadly weapon. These might include knives with dirk, dagger (double-edge), bowie, or stiletto blades. In some jurisdictions it is illegal to conceal knives larger than a certain size or with blades over a certain length, particularly when combined with locking blade mechanisms. The possession or carrying of a folding pocketknife with a quick-opening mechanism such as a gravity knife, butterfly knife (balisong), or switchblade may be prohibited. Under U.S. federal law, switchblades and ballistic knives are banned from interstate shipment, sale, or import, or possession on federal or Indian lands or U.S. possessions and may be prohibited entirely in some states. Knives of any size or configuration may be prohibited by federal or state laws in certain designated areas or places, such as schools, courthouses, jails, power plants, or airports.

== See also ==
- Butterfly knife
- Higonokami
- Laguiole knife
- Multi-tool
- Navaja
- Okapi (knife)
- Switchblade
