= Opinel =

Brand of pocket knife

- Type: Private
- Industry: Manufacturing
- Founded: 1890; 136 years ago
- Headquarters: Chambéry, Savoie, France
- Key people: Joseph Opinel (Founder); François Opinel (President); Denis Opinel (CEO)
- Products: Knives
- Revenue: €29 million (2021)
- Number of employees: 160
- Website: www.opinel.com

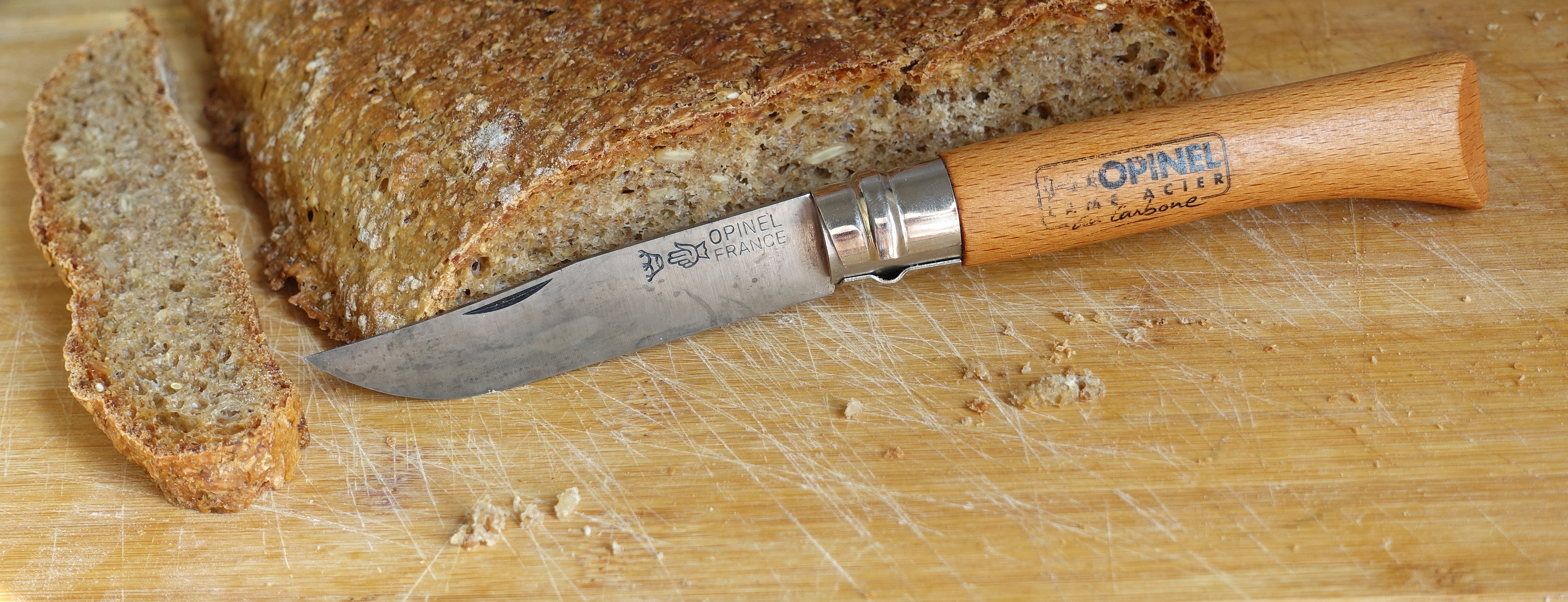
No. 10 Opinel knife with carbon steel blade, Virobloc twistlock, and beechwood handle

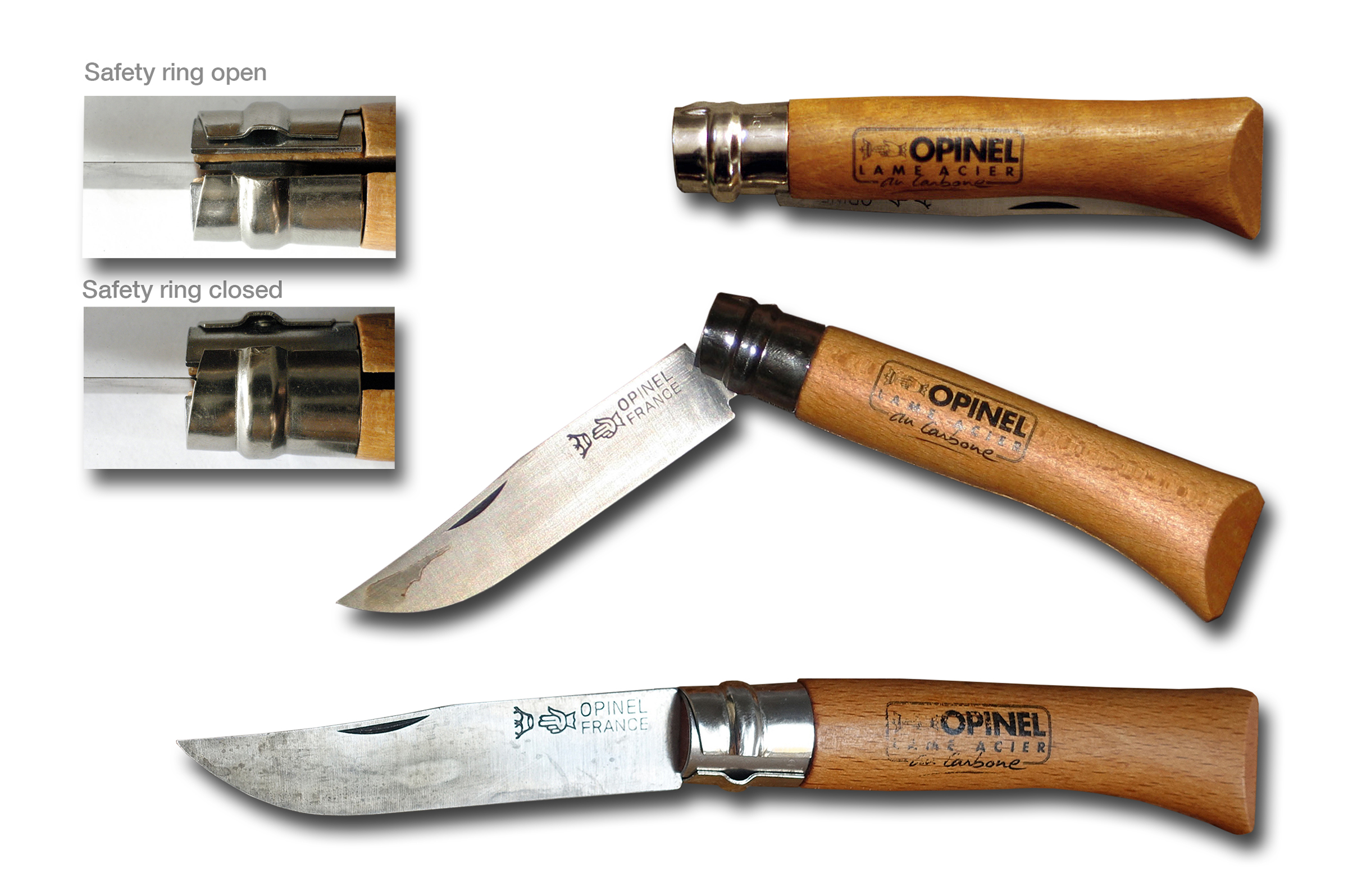
Functions of the Opinel Knife: unfolding and locking the blade

Opinel is a French manufacturer of pocket or pen knives. The company has made its line of eponymous wooden-handled knives since 1890 from its headquarters in Saint-Jean-de-Maurienne, Savoie. The company sells approximately 15 million knives annually. Opinel knives are made of both high carbon and stainless steel, the latter being Sandvik steel from Sweden.

Originally sold as a working man's knife, an Opinel knife has become emblematic of French culture. Pablo Picasso is said to have used one of the company's knives as a sculpting tool. In 1989, the Larousse dictionary cited "Opinel" as a registered trademark.

== History ==
Joseph Opinel began making knives in 1890 in Savoie, France as a simple working man's or peasant's knife. It proved popular with the local farmers, herdsmen, and paysans-vignerons (peasant winemakers) of the area. In 1897, a series of twelve sizes, numbered 1 to 12, was developed. From 1901 to 1903, Joseph Opinel built his first factory in Pont de Gévoudaz and produced a machine for mass production of the knife's wooden handles.

The company hired peddlers to sell the knives and opened a small shop near the Chambéry railway junction, where the knives became popular with PLM railroad workers, who in turn spread word of the brand throughout France. By 1909, Opinel had registered his first trademark for the Opinel knife, choosing the main couronnée ("crowned hand") as his emblem. A few years later Opinel annual sales were in the hundreds of thousands, and by the start of World War II as many as 20 million knives had been sold.

The Opinel Virobloc or safety twistlock mechanism was invented by Marcel Opinel in 1955, increasing the safety and versatility of the knife by allowing the blade to be locked in the open position. In 2000, the Virobloc locking mechanism was improved to allow locking the blade in either the open or closed position.

In 1985 the Victoria and Albert Museum in London selected the Opinel knife as part of an exhibit celebrating the “100 most beautiful products in the world”, featuring the Opinel alongside the Porsche 911 sports car and the Rolex watch. The Opinel was also selected as one of the 999 classic designs in Phaidon Design Classics, and has been exhibited by the New York's Museum of Modern Art (MOMA) as a design masterpiece.

== Description ==
=== Materials ===
The traditional Opinel knife has a beechwood handle and a high carbon XC90 steel (acier au carbone) blade. Opinel also offers most of its models with a Sandvik 12C27M stainless steel (acier inox) blade. Custom Opinel models are available using luxurious or exotic handle woods such as oak, walnut, olive wood, bubinga (African rosewood), ebony and stained hornbeam, as well as other materials such as cowhorn.

The Opinel Slim Effilé series uses a tapered handle with a slender clip point blade made of Sandvik stainless steel, and the handle may be obtained in a variety of different materials, including bubinga, olive, ebony and cowhorn.

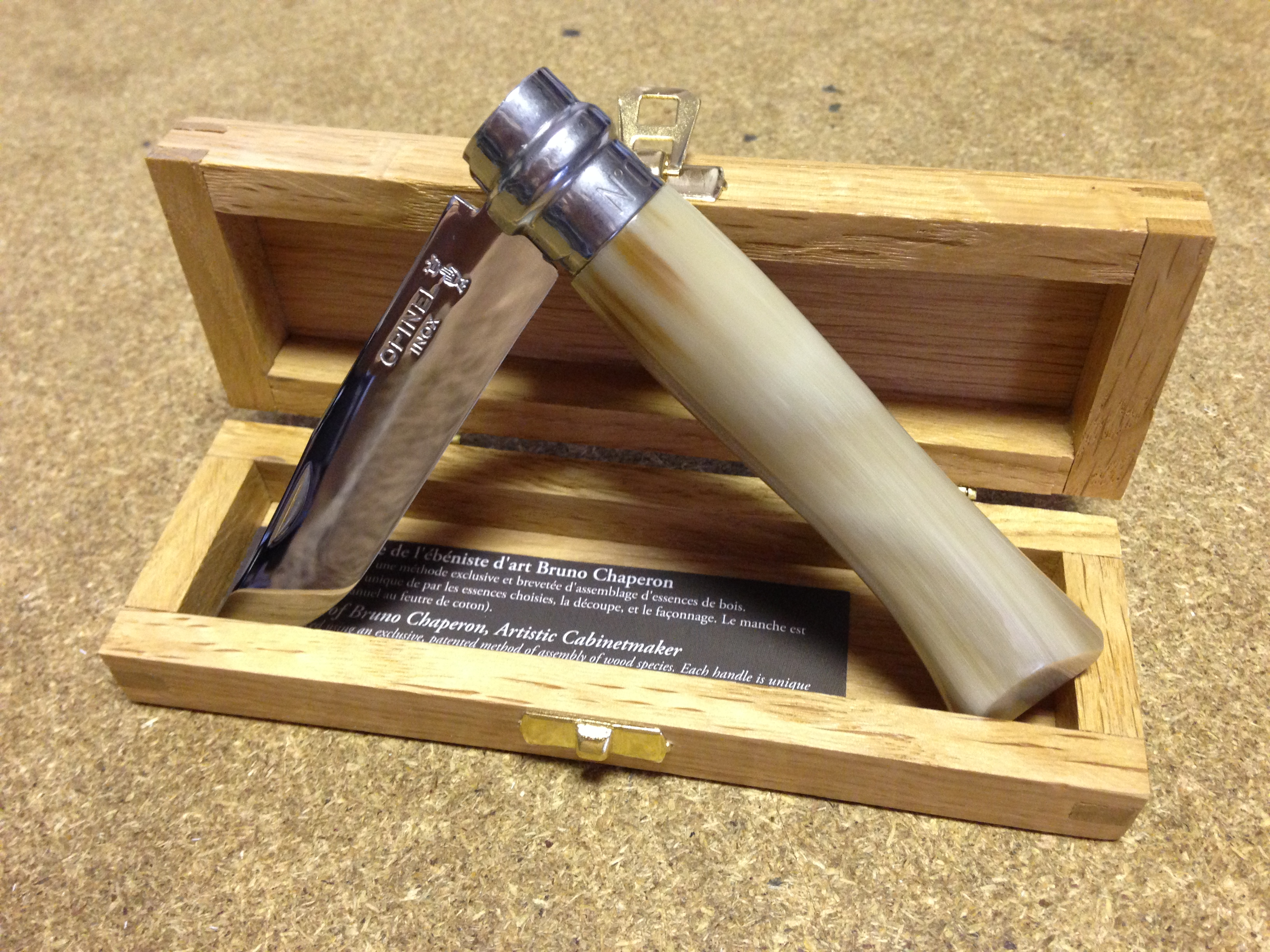
Opinel No 8 Blond Horn Handle knife

=== Construction ===
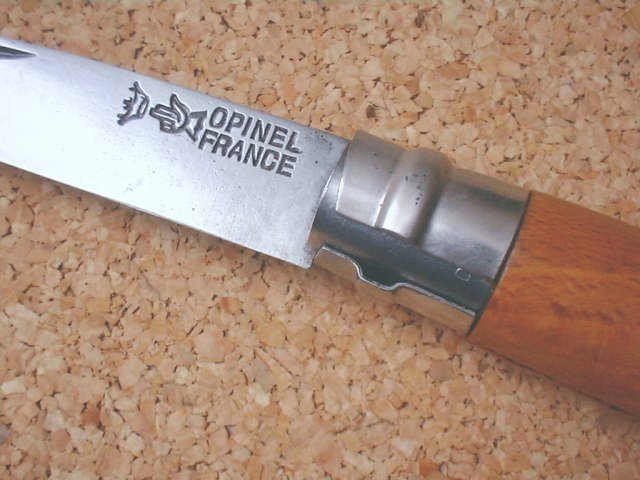
The locking ring is twisted to secure the blade in position

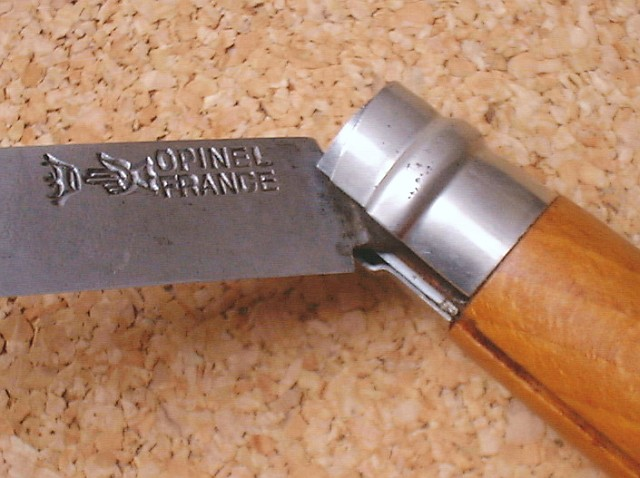
The same knife with locking ring released in order to close the blade

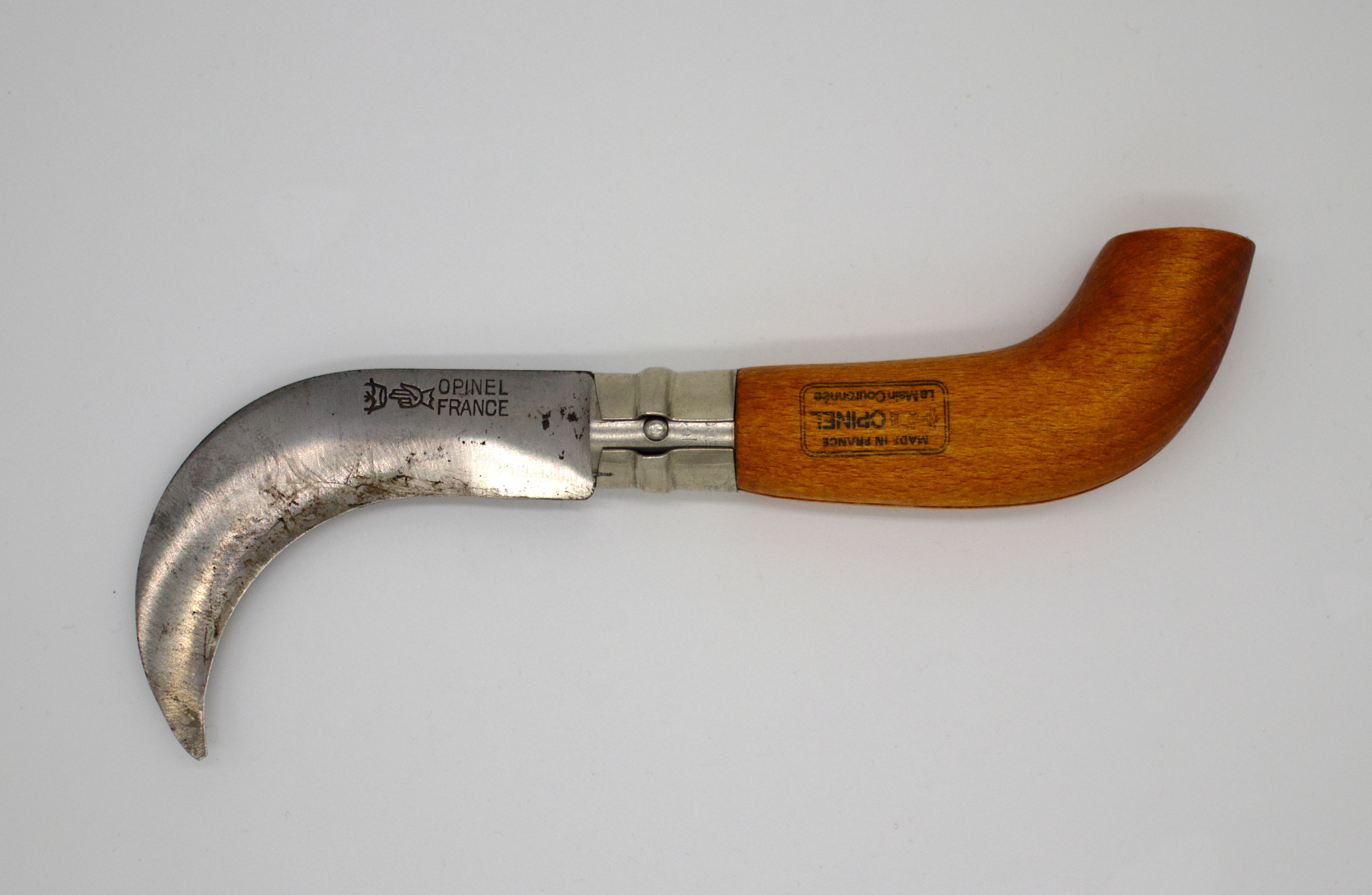
An Opinel Pruning Knife

The current Opinel knife consists of a blade, wooden handle, stainless steel metal clamping band, stainless pivot pin (axle), and (except in the case of the smaller models) a stainless steel Virobloc locking collar, which locks the blade open or closed.

Smaller Opinel models (Nos. 2 through 5) have no locking blade mechanism, and use only the friction of the clamping band against the compressed handle and knife tang to hold the blade open, much the same as all Opinel knives sold before 1955. This simple design was sometimes known as a "penny knife" or "peasant's knife".

The locking collar (Virobloc) was patented in 1955 by Marcel Opinel, and is only found on the larger Opinel models (#6 and up). While simple, the locking mechanism is quite sturdy. Due to the way in which the locking collar tapers, the blade does not loosen over time and can be fixed firmly even once the mechanism is quite worn. In 2000 the locking collar was modified slightly to allow the blade to be locked in the closed as well as the open position. This feature prevents the blade from opening by accident when carried in a pocket.

Eighty percent of all Opinel knives use traditional beechwood for the handle. The company's large demand for beechwood not infrequently results in a shortage of precut handle blanks, forcing the use of rectangular (bulk) sheets, which generate considerable wood waste. The excess wood waste and sawdust generated is subsequently recycled.

=== Design and operation ===
The curve of the original Opinel blade is a yatagan (more commonly described as a drop point with a blade slightly angled downwards from the handle centerline), while the flared butt at the base of the wood handle is referred to as a fishtail. The modern No. 8 knife consists of five pieces (formerly four); the handle, the blade, the pivot or axle, the metal collar and the locking ring or "Virobloc". The blade is quite thin, only 1.68mm (.066 inches), which helps keep its weight to only 45g (1.6 ounces). Original Opinels and the smallest sizes today are still made of only four parts, lacking the simple Virobloc locking mechanism. The locking ring can easily be removed with simple tools for use in countries where locking knives are prohibited; some sources claim that opening the blade with the ring in the locked position causes the ring to pop off; it can be replaced easily later if desired. The No. 8 Couteau du Jardin or Garden Knife uses a folding drop-point blade with a slim, tapered wood handle, while the Opinel No. 8 and No. 10 Pruning Knives, designed for pruning shrubs and vines, feature a large folding hawkbill blade fitted to an elegantly curved wooden handle. The Opinel Slim Effile series use a thinner-profile stainless steel blade fitted to a tapered wood handle. Available in several sizes and handle materials, the Slim Effile knives are intended for tasks such as cleaning and fileting fish and thinly slicing meats and cheeses.

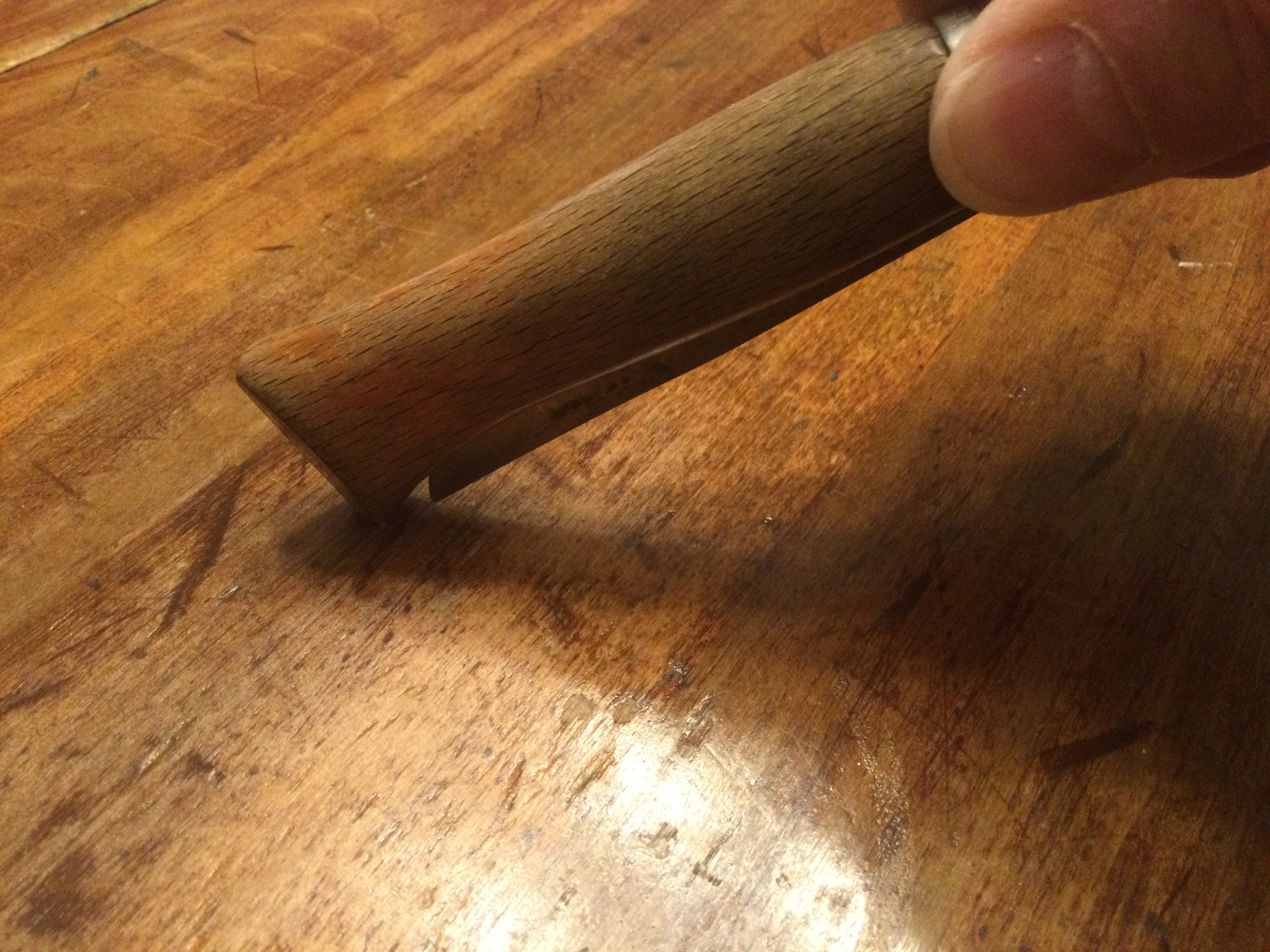
Coup du savoyard: No. 8 Opinel knife rapped on table for easier opening

The traditional Opinel is designed to be opened with two hands, and a nail nick is provided on the blade. It is possible to adjust the fitting of the safety locking collar if it is too tight or too loose. Those practiced in the art of coup du savoyard grip the metal collar between index finger and thumb and tap the heel of the handle firmly on a hard surface, as if using it as a drumstick; the blade should open slightly from the handle, allowing it to be rotated into position with the thumb.

=== Logo ===
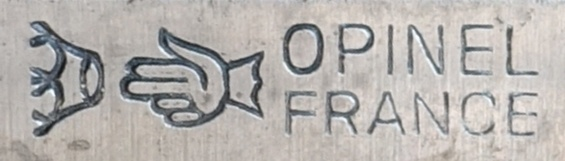
Opinel logo

The main couronnée ("crowned hand") device was already present on the blade of very early models. Later the words OPINEL and FRANCE were added, as well as INOX ("stainless", from "INOXidable", meaning "non-oxidizable) in the case of stainless steel blades.

The image of the hand comes from the arms of Saint-Jean-de-Maurienne, and represents the relics of John the Baptist, three of whose finger-bones were supposedly brought back from Alexandria by Saint Tecla in the 5th century. The crown comes from the arms of Savoy, the larger region containing Savoie.

=== Sizes and variations ===
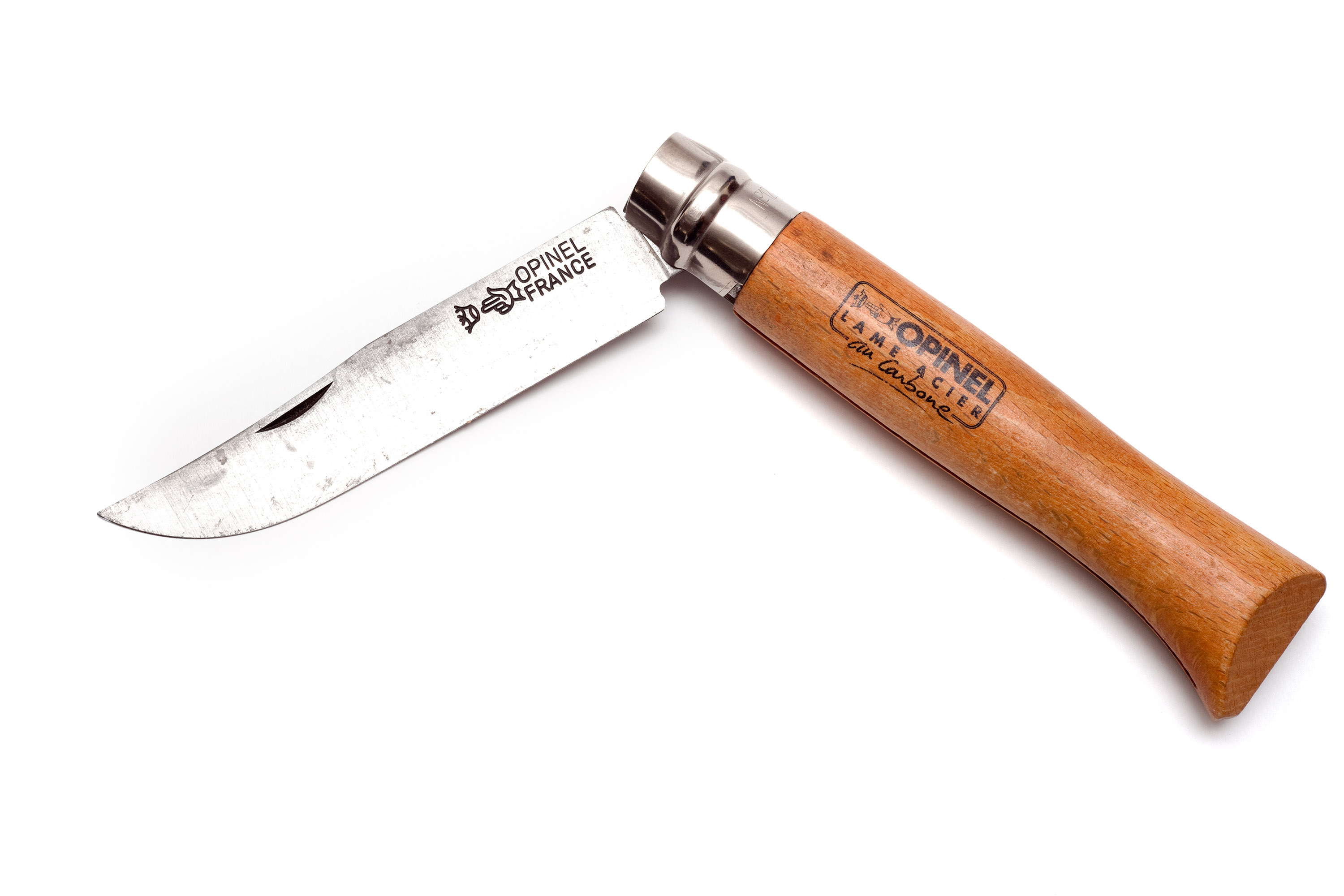
An Opinel no 12

Opinel knives are currently offered in eleven numbered sizes: 2, 3, 4, 5, 6, 7, 8, 9, 10, 12, and 13. The No. 1 Opinel was discontinued in 1932. With its tiny 2 cm (0.787-inch) blade and boxwood handle, it was meant to be attached to a key fob or watch chain and used as a tobacco pipe cleaner or nail cleaner, but was judged to be too small. The No. 11 Opinel was discontinued in 1935, its size being considered too similar to Opinels Nos. 10 and 12.

With its 8.5 cm blade, the No. 8 Opinel is perhaps the most widely used size, though Nos. 4, 6, and 10 are consistent sellers. There is a considerable difference in size between No. 12 (12 cm blade) and the recently-added novelty No. 13, Le Géant ("the Giant") with its 22 cm blade. There is now a No. 7 round-ended knife without the sharp point, intended for children and others as "My first Opinel".

A variety of different Opinels have been offered over the years. A few are sold more for their novelty value than for practical purposes, such as Le Géant. Besides the Slim Effile series and the Couteau du Jardin, Opinel also offers a hawkbill-bladed pruning knife designed for use in the garden or vineyard, and a large folding wood saw with locking blade using the same Virobloc mechanism as found on large Opinel knives. For the kitchen, the company sells vegetable peelers, chefs knives, paring knives, knives with corkscrews (couteau tire-bouchon), and prep knives for the kitchen, including a mushroom knife (couteau à champignon), with an integral boar's hair cleaning brush. In 2014, Opinel again released new varieties of knives for cooking.

== See also ==
- Laguiole knife
- Douk-Douk
- Knife legislation
