= Slipjoint =

Type of knife

A slipjoint knife is one of the most ubiquitous types of pocketknives. A slipjoint knife consists of a handle with one or more folding blades. These blades are held in position by a strong "backspring" which biases them towards the open and closed position (that is the spring tries to hold the blade closed until it has been pulled past a 90 degree arc from the handle, when the spring force reverses and the blade is inclined to spring to the open position—or at least resists closing once open. Some knife blades feature a "neutral" position where when opened to 90 degrees from the handle, the blade enters a third detent and neither tries to open or close.) Contrast this with the penny knife, which has no locking mechanism other than friction, or locking knives, which mechanically lock the blade in position.

== Variants ==
The United States produced a massive array of slipjoint knife models from the mid-19th century to the present day. The following is a list of representative models and their defining features:

- Peanut—a very small (3 in (76 mm) or less) pocketknife, with a slightly irregular ovaloid shape resembling an elongated peanut. Generally, it has two blades of different sizes/profiles opening from the same end.
- Barlow—a medium-sized pocketknife of tapered oval construction, with one or two blades of different sizes/profiles opening from the same end.
- Sunfish or Elephant's Toenail—a small pocket knife with a very wide body. It usually has two blades, one of which has the same wide body as the handle. The blades usually open from either end.
- Congress—a small pocket knife with a shallow concave back and a shallow convex top. Usually carries four blades that open at opposite ends.
- Sowbelly or Stockman knife—a medium-sized pocket knife of 3 to 4 in (76 to 102 mm), with a bend in the body. Three blades with one clip point, one with a sheepsfoot, and one spey blade is a common configuration. Blades typically open from both ends.
- Canoe—a medium-sized knife 3 to 4 in (76 to 102 mm), rather wide with a slight curve. Generally, it has one large and one small blade at opposite ends.
- Trapper—a medium-sized pocket knife with a rounded end that tapers slightly towards the knife's end. Two blades with a clip point and a spey blade is a common configuration. Both blades open from the same end.

== Legal status ==
In several countries, such as the United Kingdom, slipjoints are used over locking folders due to laws regarding carrying knives for general use. In Germany, because the use of locking one handed opening (OHO) knives is restricted, slipjoint knives are a viable alternative.
