= Karl Elsener =

Karl or Carl Elsener may refer to:

- Karl Elsener (footballer) (1934–2010), Swiss football goalkeeper
- Karl Elsener (inventor) (1860–1918), inventor of the Swiss Army knife
- Carl Elsener (1886–1950), entrepreneur, son of the inventor
- Carl Elsener Sr. (1922–2013), entrepreneur, nephew of the inventor
- Carl Elsener Jr. (born 1958), entrepreneur, grand-nephew of the inventor
