= Taschibra =

Brazilian multinational company

Brasilux Ind Comercio Importação e Exportação LTDA
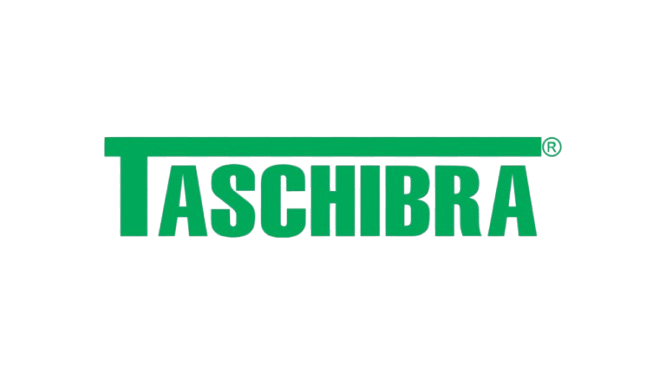
- Trade name: Taschibra
- Type: Private
- Industry: Lighting production and sales
- Founded: 1995; 31 years ago
- Founder: Afonso Luiz Schreiber
- Headquarters: Indaial, Brazil
- Area served: 6 countries
- Products: Linghting products, including LED lights
- Production output: 4,5 million (2016)
- Number of employees: 400 (2025)
- Website: https://www.taschibra.com.br

Taschibra is a Brazilian multinational company from the lighting sector.

== History ==
Originally called Brasilux, the company was founded by Afonso Luiz Schreiber in 1995 on Indaial.

In 2016, Taschibra bought Blumenox Iluminação and invested R$ 10 million to expand their industrial site. In 2018, the company built their new administrative center near BR-470 for R$ 12 million.

In 2018, because of the economical crisis, the company fired 150 workers and began the fabrication of handcrafted glass chandeliers as a way to diminish importations and aim at a "neglected" market segment.

== Other projects ==
Taschibra has their own futsal team, Taschibra Futsal. They also sponsor local soccer teams, such as Figueirense FC.

Since 2008, Taschibra maintains the project “O trabalho que reacende”, where they employ prisoners from the Advanced Prison Unit of Indaial, on Vale do Itajaí. The inmates work in exchange of reduction of sentence and a third of the normal wages.

== Products and operation ==
Taschibra produces all kids of lighting products. In 2016, they produced 4.5 million light fixtures per year, with their LED lights corresponding to 40% of the production. The company also resells Chinese products. In 2018, the company imported 70% of their products.

Taschibra operates in several countries, including Paraguay, Uruguay, Bolivia, Chile and Mozambique.

== See also ==
- List of multinational corporations
