= Carl Elsener Sr. =

Swiss entrepreneur

Carl Elsener
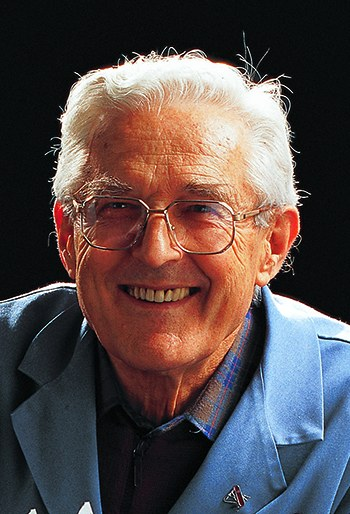
- Born: July 6, 1922; Schwyz, Switzerland
- Died: 1 June 2013 (aged 90); Schwyz, Switzerland
- Occupation: Swiss entrepreneur

Carl Elsener Sr. (also known as Charles Elsener or Carl Elsener III, born 6 July 1922, Ibach, Switzerland † 1 June 2013 Schwyz, Switzerland) was a Swiss entrepreneur.

== Life ==
Carl Elsener was the grandson of Karl Elsener (1860–1918) and the son of Carl Elsener (1886–1950). Karl Elsener had opened a factory in Ibach for the production of knives and surgical instruments, from which the knife factory Victorinox developed.

Carl Elsener led the company initially with his father and his brother Eduard Elsener (b. 1926). After the death of his father in 1950, he took over the management. The Swiss Army Knife is considered to be one of his works.

Under the leadership of Carl Elsener Sr., the Messerfabrik became the largest company in the canton of Schwyz. In 1938, Elsener joined the company, which at the time had employed 80 people. At the time of his death, there was well over a thousand employees. Elsener is described as a boss who was able to operate almost all the machines himself, who was traveling in the "Lismerli" or in the blue work coat and who cycled to the factory. He never owned a car. A few years before his death, he felt healthy enough to put in an 80-hour week.

In October 2000, Elsner founded together with his brother Eduard Elsener and his son Carl Elsener Jr. as a successor solution, the Victorinox-Stiftung to ensure the continued existence and further prosperity of the company. The foundation holds 75 percent of the shares of Victorinox AG, another 15 percent belong to the non-profit Carl und Elise Elsener-Gut Stiftung. The Elsener family owns 10 percent of the shares.

After Carl Elsener Sr. died, his son Carl Elsener Jr. (* 1958) has been managing the company since 2007.

== Awards ==
- 2011: Cutlery Hall of Fame Award of Magazine Blade.
