= Advanced Prison Unit of Indaial =

Prison in Santa Catarina, Brazil

Coordinates: 26.8972°S 49.2252°W

- Unidade Prisional Avançada de Indaial
- Interactive map of the Advanced Prison Unit of Indaial area

General information
- Type: Prison
- Location: Otto Stange Street, 127, Indaial, Brazil
- Completed: 2002

The Advanced Prison Unit of Indaial is a prison from the city of Indaial, known for their reintegration programs through public and private partnerships where the inmates receive wages and reduction of sentences through work.

== History ==
The Advanced Prison Unit (UPA) of Indaial was created by the Law Nº 12.116, 7 January 2002, signed by the Governor of Santa Catarina Esperidião Amin.

== Reintegration programs ==
The UPA is known for their reintegration programs for inmates, where they can work in exchange for a reduction of sentence. In 2013, 43% of Santa Catarina inmates were working, the biggest percentage in Brazil. The Law of Penal Executions determines that only 10% of an affiliated company can be made of inmates to avoid exploitation. At the UPA, the inmates are paid a minimum of R$ 800,00 and graduate in the primary education by the Education Center for Young and Adults and technical courses by SENAI. The majority of the inmates chooses to work. The inmates can also reduce their sentences through reading. According to the police, the programs reduced indiscipline and escapes. In 2018, the UPA competed for the Inovare award for the lack of escapes and internal traffic for more than 5 years.

Since 2008, Taschibra maintains the project "O trabalho que reacende", where they employ prisoners from the UPA. The project was idealized by Renato Grahl. The inmates receive a third of the normal wages. According to the company, they use their cheap labor to diminish Chinese importations. The inmates don't receive wages if there are production errors.

In 2017, the Indaial Prefecture launched the project "Integrar", idealized by Aetius Timar Hennings. Eight inmates worked in public cleaning with the supervision of the Secretary of Sanitization and Environment. The prisoners received minimum wage and a meal. After two years, the program expanded to other areas in the public sector and there were 22 inmates working.

== Incidents ==
The UPA suffers from overcrowding. In 2013, the Justice Court of Santa Catarina deemed as favorable the appeal made by the Public Ministry of Santa Catarina regarding overcrowding and structural reforms. In March 2020, the reopening of the UPA of Ituporanga was studied as a way of transferring inmates from Indaial.

In August 2019, the police accused 15 inmates of planning an armed scape.
