= Karl Elsener (inventor) =

Swiss cutler, inventor and entrepreneur

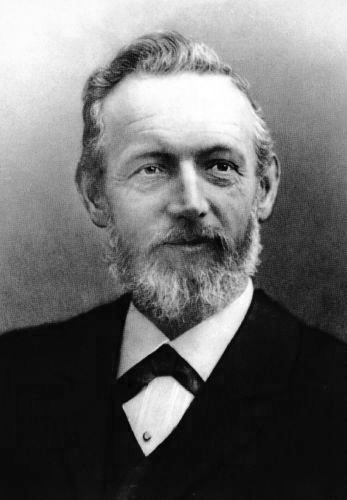
- Elsener c. 1915

Member of the Cantonal Council of Schwyz
- In office 1912 – 1918 (his death)

Personal details
- Born: Karl Elsener; 9 October 1860 Schwyz, Switzerland
- Died: 26 December 1918 (aged 58) Schwyz, Switzerland
- Spouse(s): Josefa Holdener (m. 1885; died 1895) Josefina Mattmann (m. 1898) Marie Steiner (m. 1912)
- Children: 8
- Occupation: Businessman, inventor, politician

Karl Elsener also known Karl Elsener I (9 October 1860 – 26 December 1918) was a Swiss businessman, inventor and politician. In 1884, Elsener founded Victorinox, known for making Swiss Army knives. He also served on the Cantonal Council of Schwyz from 1912 to 1918.

== Early life and education ==
Elsener was born 9 October 1860 in Schwyz, Switzerland, the oldest of four children, to Balthasar Elsener (1826–1893), a hat maker, and Victoria Elsener (née Ott; 1836–1909), into a Catholic family. His siblings were Alois Elsener, Louise Tschümperlin (née Elsener) and Anna Scott (née Elsener). Elsener completed an apprenticeship as a knife maker in Zug.

== Career ==
After several years as a wandering journeyman in other European countries, he returned to his home country, and was inspired to start his own company. Apparently, some of that inspiration came from the initiative to give work to locals, who otherwise would have been forced to emigrate.

In 1884, Elsener became the sole proprietor of a small factory in Ibach, which manufactured knives and surgical instruments. He initially employed roughly 30 people. In 1891, the Swiss government sought new suppliers for the Swiss army knife, which was previously supplied by German manufacturers from Solingen. After Elsener was awarded the production, the competition started a price war, which he only survived by going into debt.

In 1897, built on the success of the supply to the Swiss army, Elsener invented a unique folding mechanism which was used in a new knife style. He called this an officer knife (Offiziersmesser), since it was less heavy and more sleek in appearance. Although the Swiss government never purchased this model, it kept its name. By 1918, Victorinox had roughly 100 employees and was nationally well known.

== Politics ==
Elsener was a conservative politician who served on the Cantonal Council of Schwyz from 1912 to 1918. He briefly also served on the municipal council of Ibach in 1918.

== Personal life ==
In 1885, Elsener married Josefa Holdener, with whom he had eight children, including Carl Elsener (1886–1950), who led Victorinox successfully for many decades and made the knives known nationally and internationally. Carl had one son, Carl Elsener Sr. (1922–2013), and one grandson, Carl Elsener Jr. (born 1958), who leads the company today.

After his wife passed away, Elsener married Josefina Mattmann, and later Marie Steiner.

Elsener died 26 December 1918 in Schwyz, Switzerland.
