= Carl Elsener Jr. =

Swiss entrepreneur

Carl Elsener
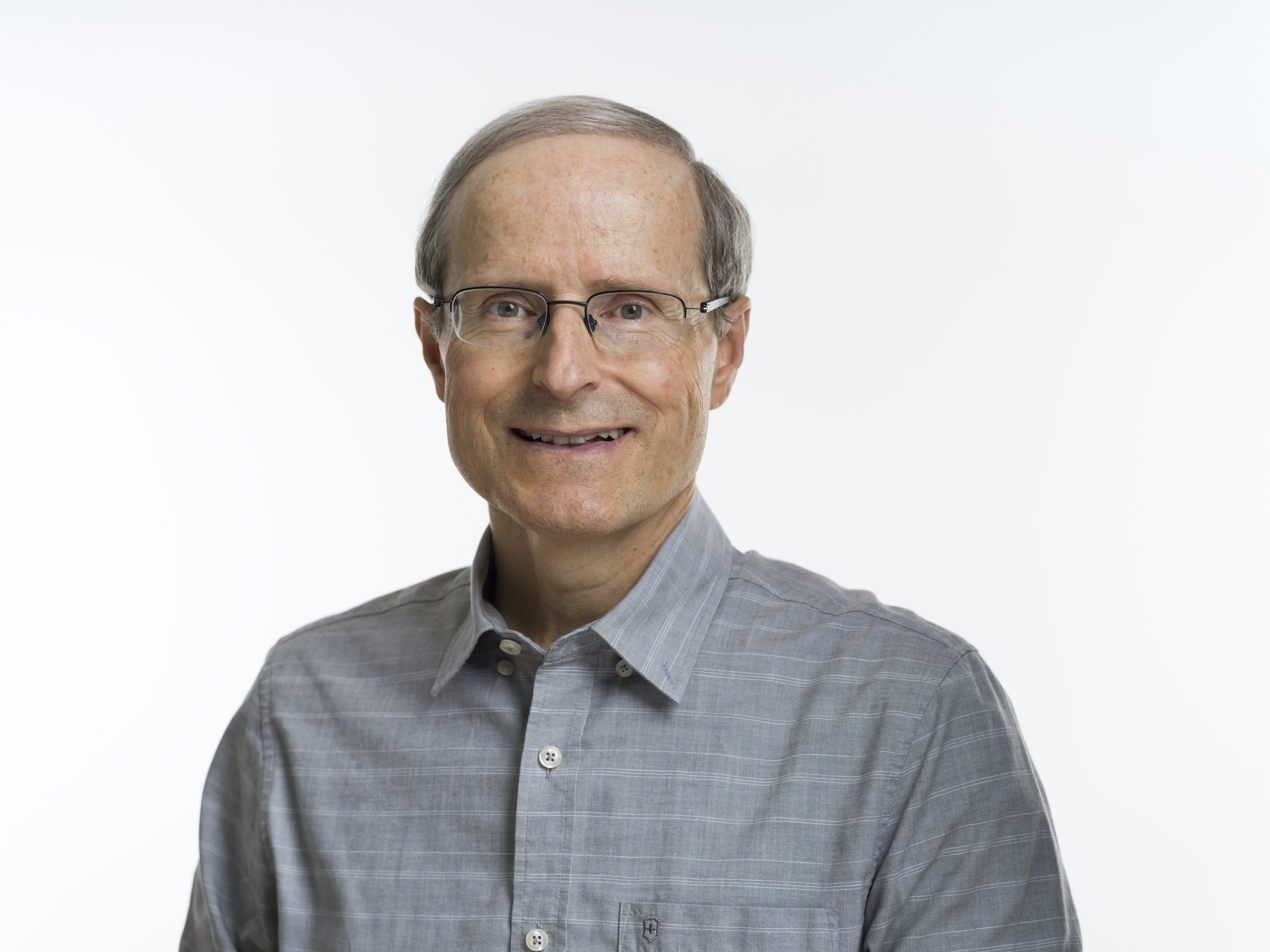
- Born: July 1958 (age 67)
- Occupation: CEO of Victorinox
- Spouse: Veronika Elsener
- Children: 3

Carl Josef Otto Elsener (also known as Carl Elsener Jr. or Carl Elsener IV) (born July 1958) is a Swiss entrepreneur and, since 2007, CEO of Victorinox AG, a family-owned company that employed 2,000 people worldwide in 2015.

== Life ==
Carl Elsener Jr. is the great-grandson of Karl Elsener (1860–1918) and the son of Carl Elsener Sr. (1922–2013). Karl Elsener had opened a factory in Ibach in 1884 for the production of knives and surgical instruments, from which the Messerfabrik Victorinox developed.

In October 2000, Elsener founded together with his father and his brother Eduard Elsener as a successor solution, the Victorinox-Stiftung, to ensure the survival and further prosperity of the family business. The foundation holds 75 percent of the shares of Victorinox AG, another 15 percent belongs to the non-profit Carl und Elise Elsener-Gut Stiftung. The Elsener family owns 10 percent of the shares.

Since 2007, Elsener has led the company as CEO and chairman of the board of directors.

== Awards ==
- 2011 SwissAward, Business category
