= Bihl =

Bihl is a surname. Notable people with the surname include:

- Agnès Bihl (born 1974), French singer
- Staif Bihl (fl. 1996–2023), member of the Eths, French Metalcore band
- Thomas Bihl (born 1975), German poker player

== See also ==
- Bill (surname)
