= Victorinox =

Swiss knife manufacturer and watchmaker

Coordinates: 47°0′57″N 8°38′54″E

Victorinox AG
- Formerly: Messerfabrik Carl Elsener
- Type: Aktiengesellschaft
- Founded: 1884; 142 years ago (as Messerfabrik Carl Elsener); 2 January 1979 (as Victorinox AG)
- Founder: Karl Elsener
- Headquarters: Ibach, Canton of Schwyz, Switzerland
- Area served: Worldwide
- Key people: Carl Elsener Jr. (President, CEO & Chairman)
- Products: Swiss Army knives, cutlery, watches, travel gear, fragrances
- Revenue: CHF 510 million (2014)
- Owners: Victorinox-Stiftung (90%); Carl und Elise Elsener-Gut Stiftung (10%)
- Number of employees: 1,850 (2014)
- Divisions: Swiss Army Brands, Inc.; Victorinox Swiss Army Fragrance AG; Victorinox Swiss Army Watch SA; Victorinox Travel Gear AG; Regional divisions: Victorinox Andes SA; Victorinox Brazil; Victorinox Commercial (China) Co. Ltd; Victorinox Hong Kong Limited; Victorinox India Pvt. Ltd.; Victorinox Japan Inc.; Victorinox México SA; Victorinox Peru SAC; Victorinox Poland SP ZOO; Victorinox Swiss Army Inc.
- Subsidiaries: Wenger SA
- Website: www.victorinox.com

Victorinox (/vɪkˈtɒriˌnɒks/) is a knife manufacturer and watchmaker and travel gear brand licensor based in the town of Ibach, in the Canton of Schwyz, Switzerland. It is known for its Swiss Army knives. Since its acquisition of rival Wenger in 2005, it has become the sole supplier of multi-purpose knives to the Swiss army. It is the world's biggest manufacturer of pocket knives. By 2002, it had also fully acquired Forschner Group, a partially affiliated company that had owned some "Swiss Army" branding rights in the United States since the 1980s. Its brands also include SwissGear, a backpack and luggage brand that had been introduced by Wenger.

== History ==
=== Founding ===
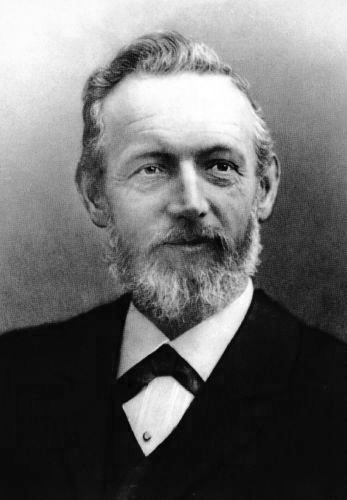
Karl Elsener

The company was founded in 1884 as Messerfabrik Carl Elsener, the workshop of Karl Elsener in Ibach. In 1891, Elsener co-founded Schweizerischer Messerschmiedverband an association of Swiss knife manufacturers.

This began their relationship delivering knives to the Swiss army. In 1892, most of Elsener's knife craftsmen left knives manufacturing as it became apparent that Solingen manufacturers could deliver at a lower price. Elsener persisted in competing with Solingen, hence incurring severe financial losses.

Elsener's Schweizer Offiziers- und Sportmesser was patented in 1897, and was later marketed internationally as the Original Swiss Army Knife. This knife was not adopted by the Swiss Armed Forces as ordnance, but its commercial success allowed the company to recover financially.

Upon the death of his mother in 1909, Elsener named the brand "Victoria" in her honor. The same year, the Swiss coat of arms was introduced as the company logo.

In 1921, the company changed its trade name to the present "Victorinox", a portmanteau of "Victoria" and "inox", an abbreviation for acier inoxydable, French for stainless steel. Its legal name was officially changed in 1979.

=== Original versus Genuine ===
From 1908 to 2005, the delivery of knives to the Swiss Armed Forces was shared with Wenger.

A compromise between the two companies stated that Victorinox would market their knives as the "Original Swiss Army Knives", while Wenger would market theirs as "Genuine Swiss Army Knives".

Wenger was acquired by Victorinox in 2005. Knives actually made for the army (as opposed to the generic "Swiss Army" trademark) are known as Soldatenmesser ("soldier knives").

These were produced in five generations, known by the date of their introduction as models 1890, 1908, 1951, 1961 and "08" (with minor variants within each generation).

Model 1890 was originally produced by Wester & Co, Solingen, and produced by Elsenser in competition with the Solingen manufacturer.

Models 1908 and 1951 were also produced by several companies in Germany and Switzerland.

Model 1961 was produced exclusively by Victorinox and Wenger, and Model 08, introduced after the acquisition of Wenger, is exclusively manufactured by Victorinox.

=== Swiss army issued knives: 1890–2008 ===
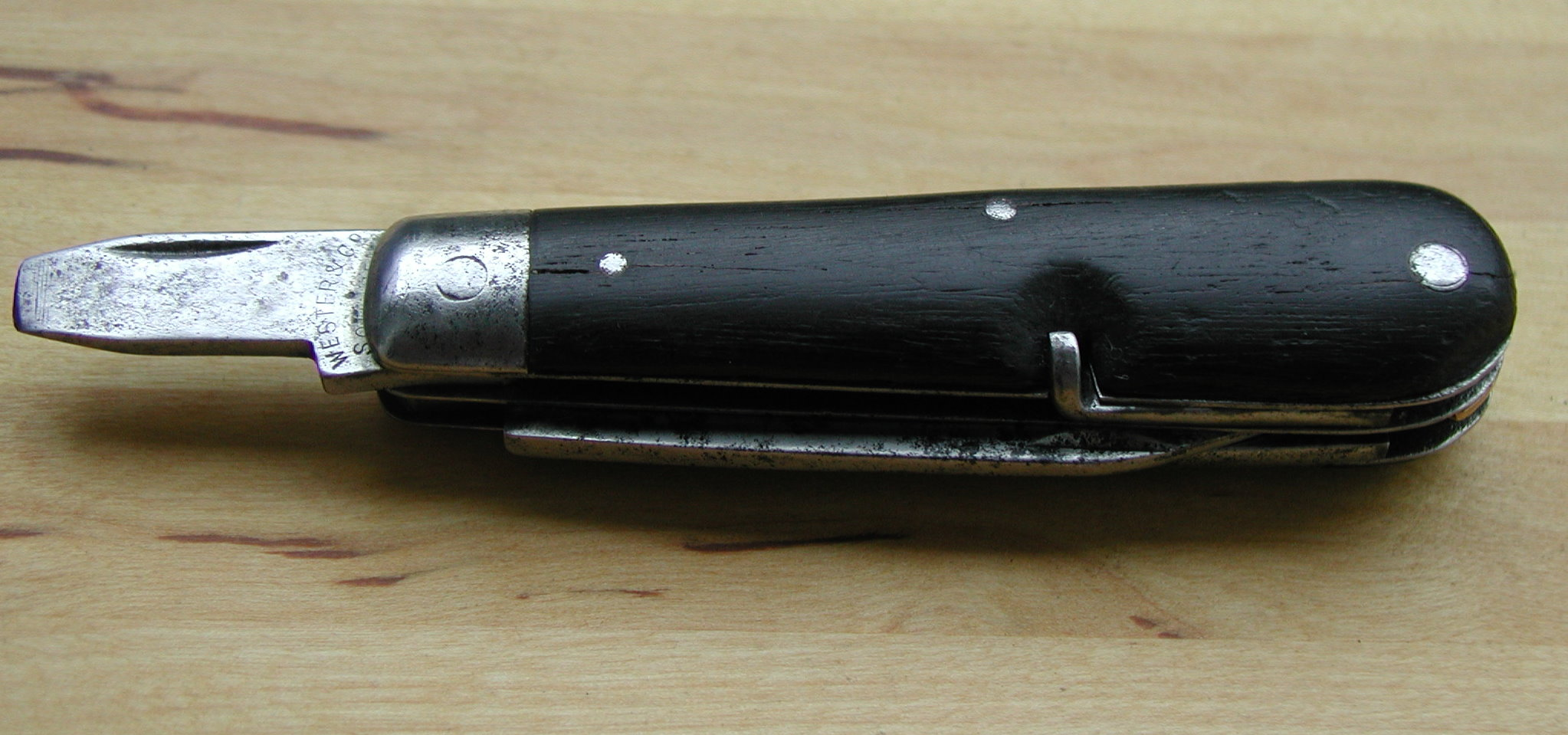
Modell 1890

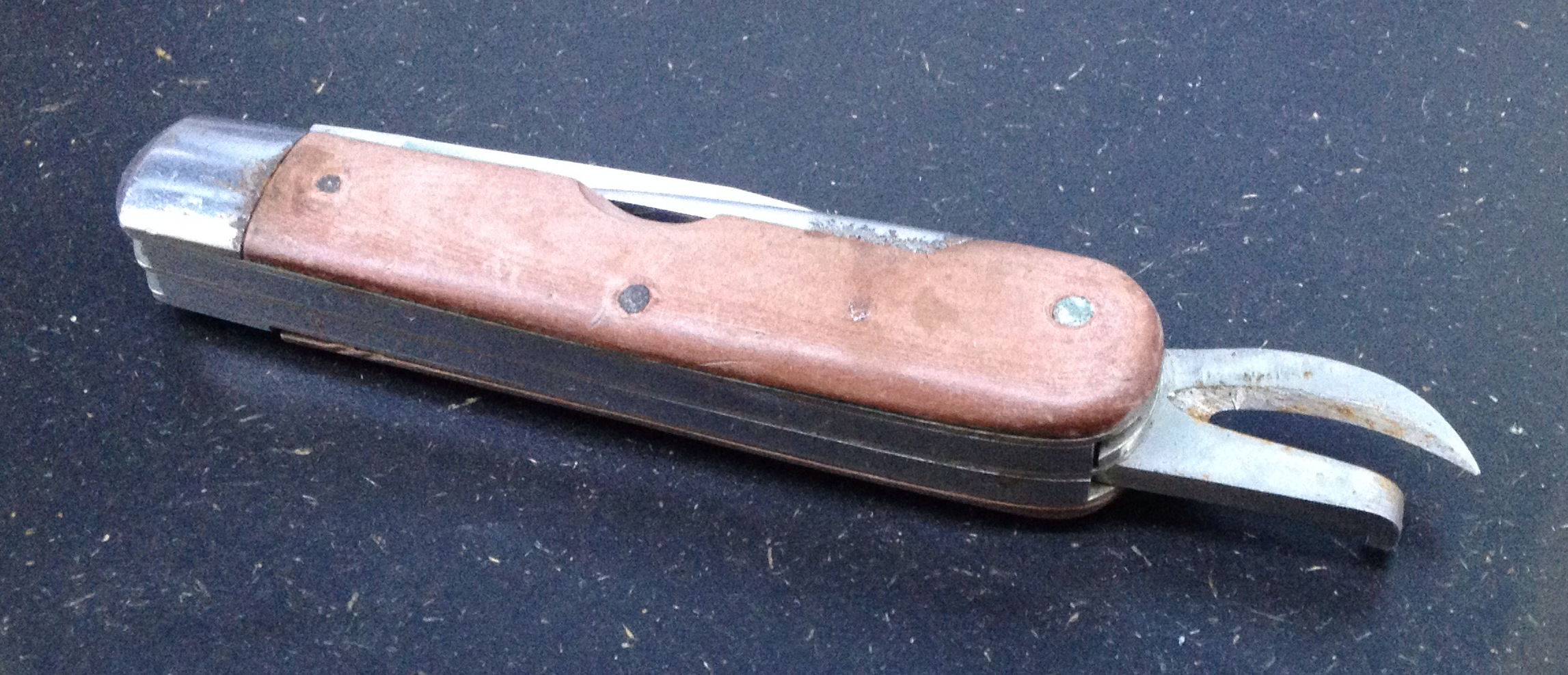
Modell 1908

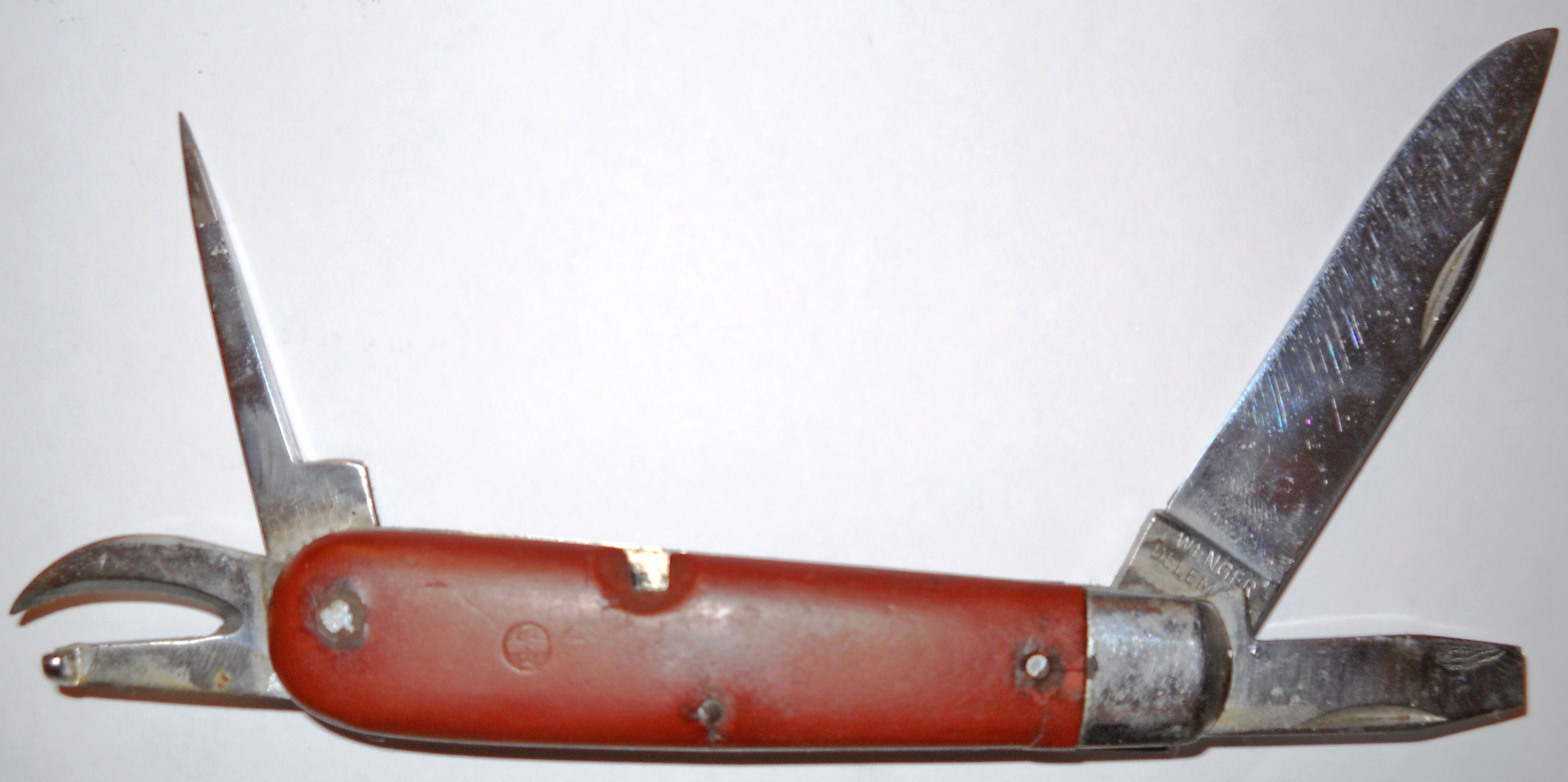
Modell 1951

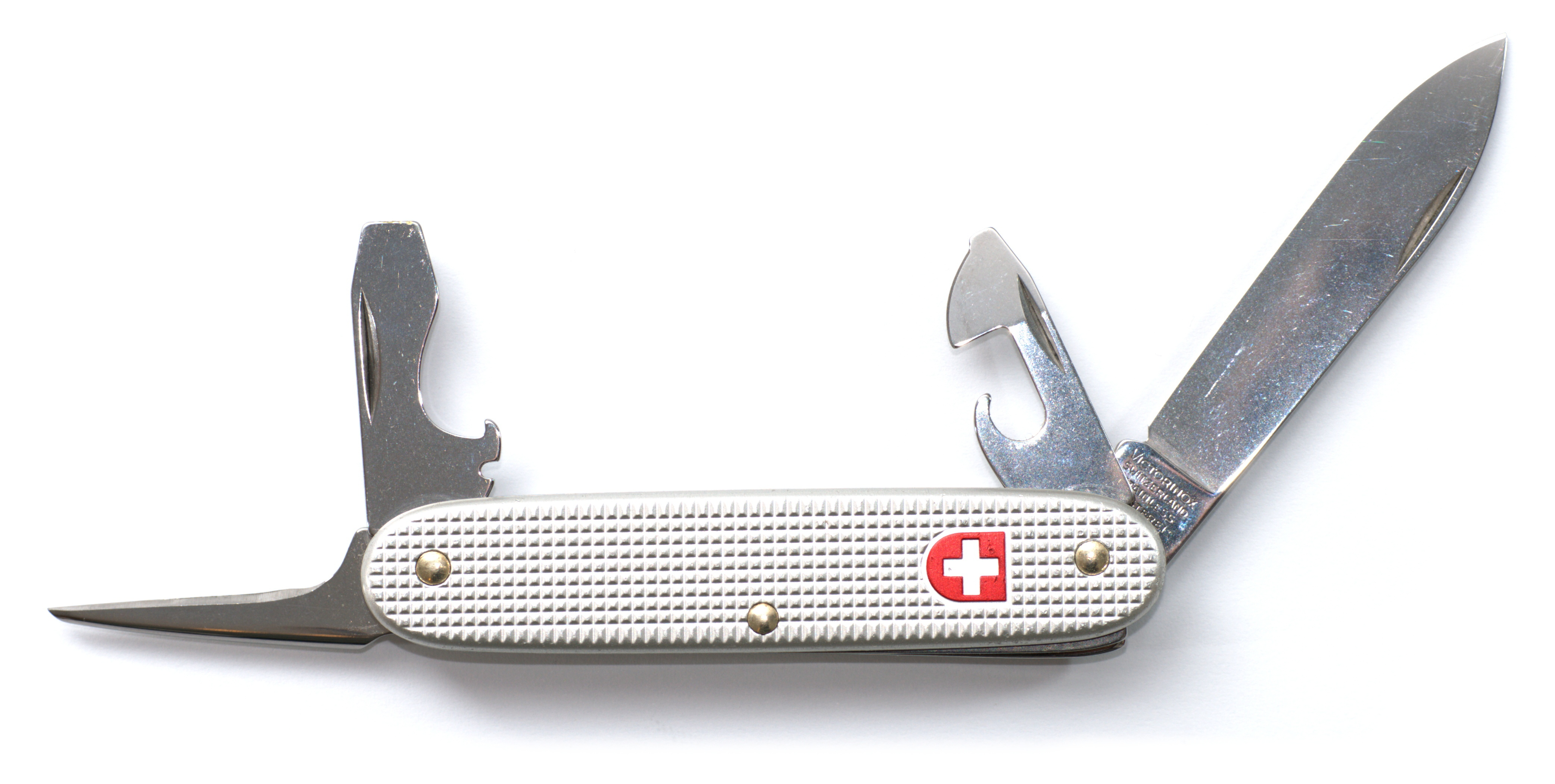
Modell 1961 (1994 variant)

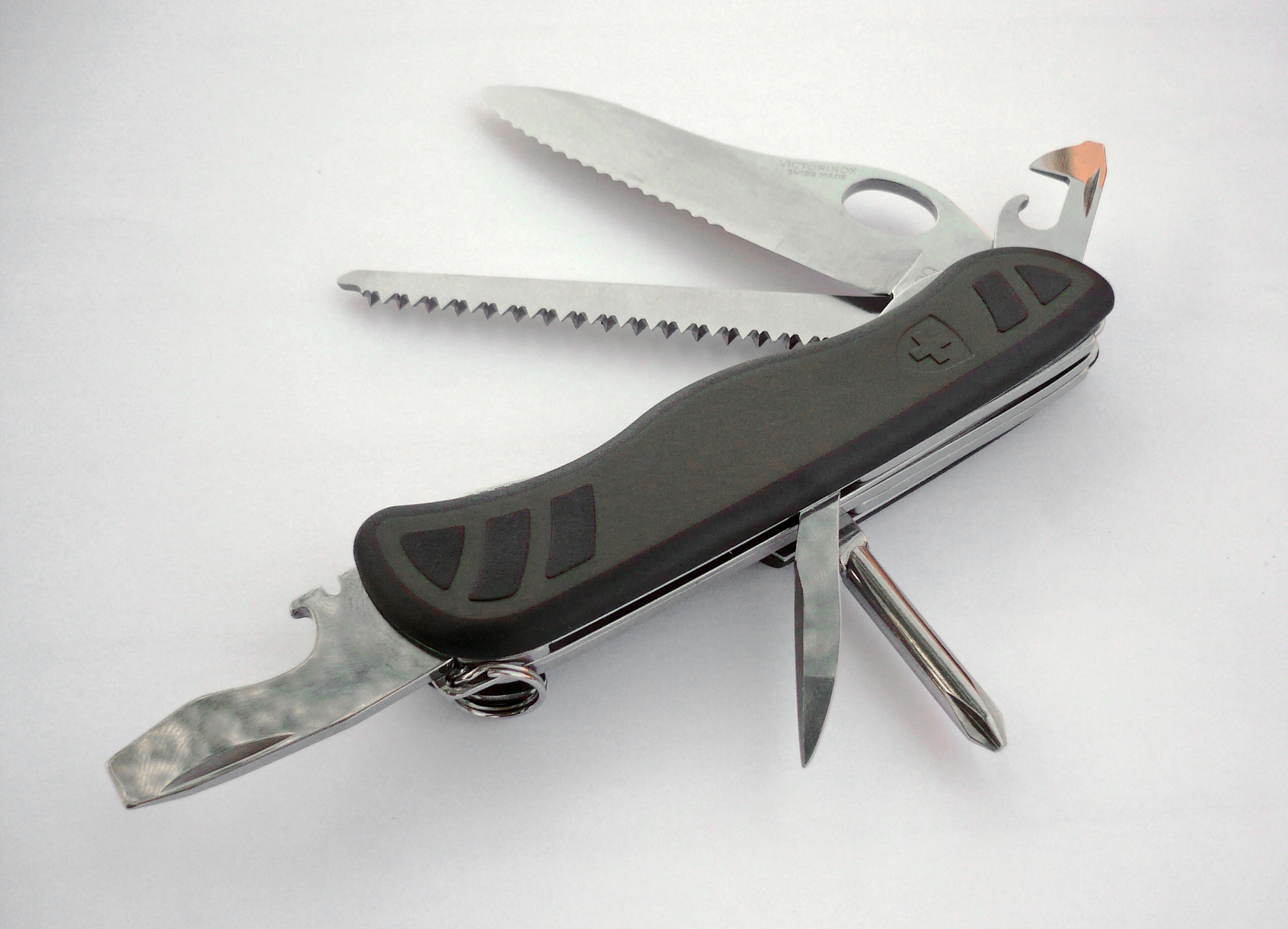
Soldatenmesser 2008

=== Wenger acquisition ===
On 26 April 2005, Victorinox acquired Wenger, the other official supplier of the Swiss Army knife, announcing that it intended to keep both brands intact, only separate entities.

In 2006, the company had a workforce of 900 employees. Its daily output was about 34000 Swiss Army knives, 38000 multi-tools, and 30000 household kitchen knives. Approximately 90% of its production is exported to more than 100 countries.

On 30 January 2013, Victorinox announced that the company was merging Wenger's knife product lines with the Victorinox brand to strengthen its competitive position internationally.

== Products ==
=== Swiss Army knives ===
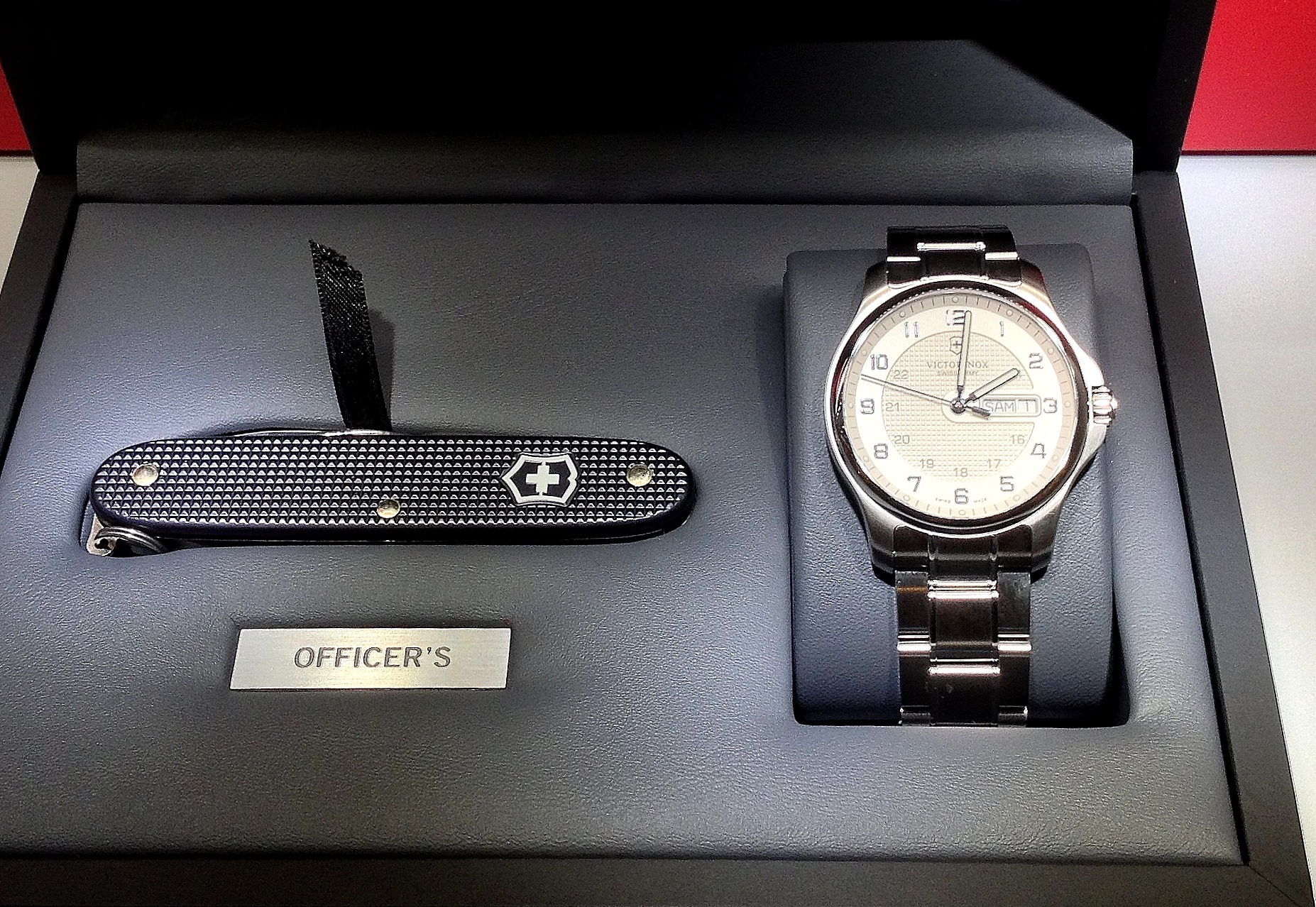
Victorinox "Officer's Watch" (basic design)

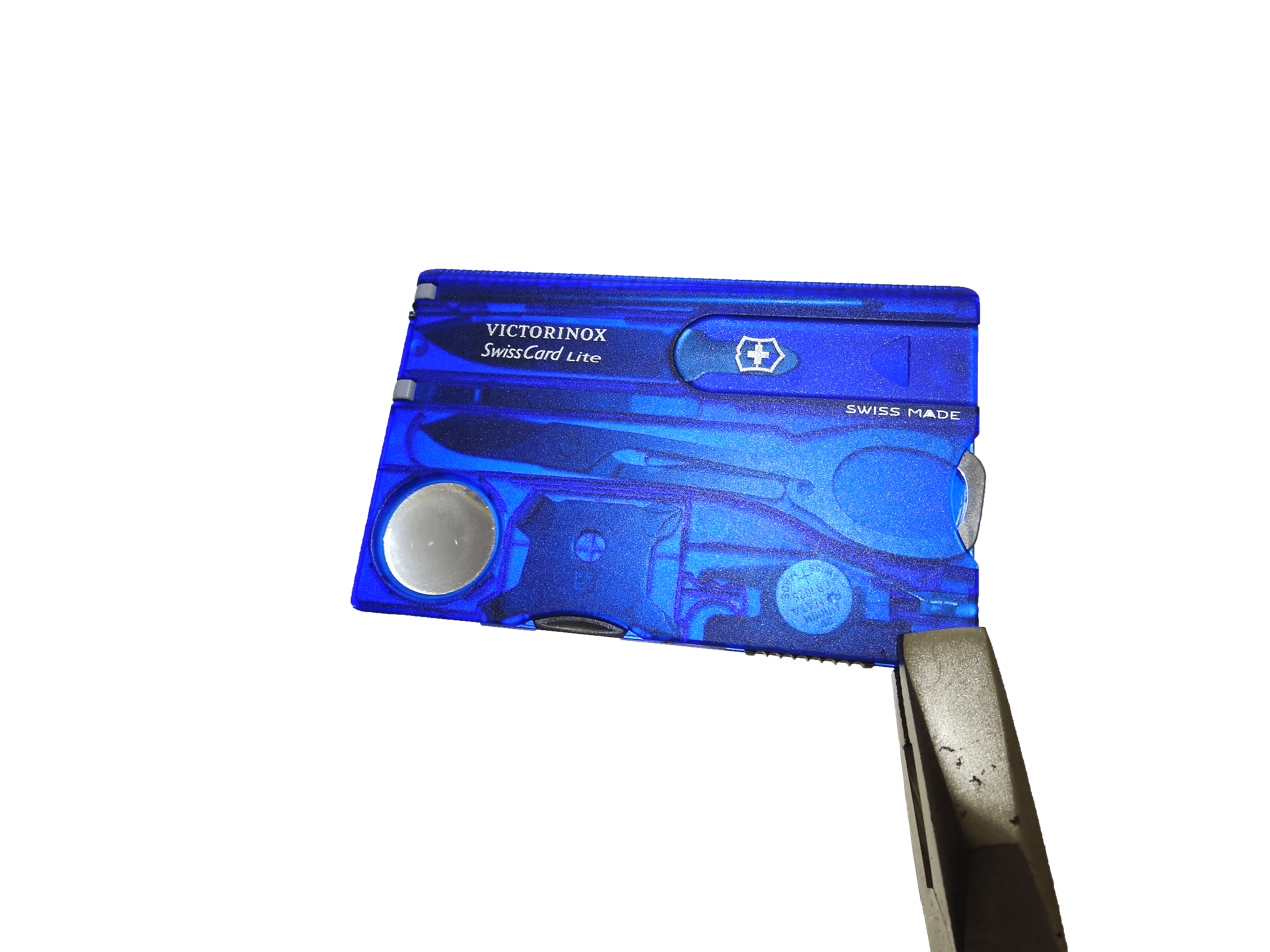
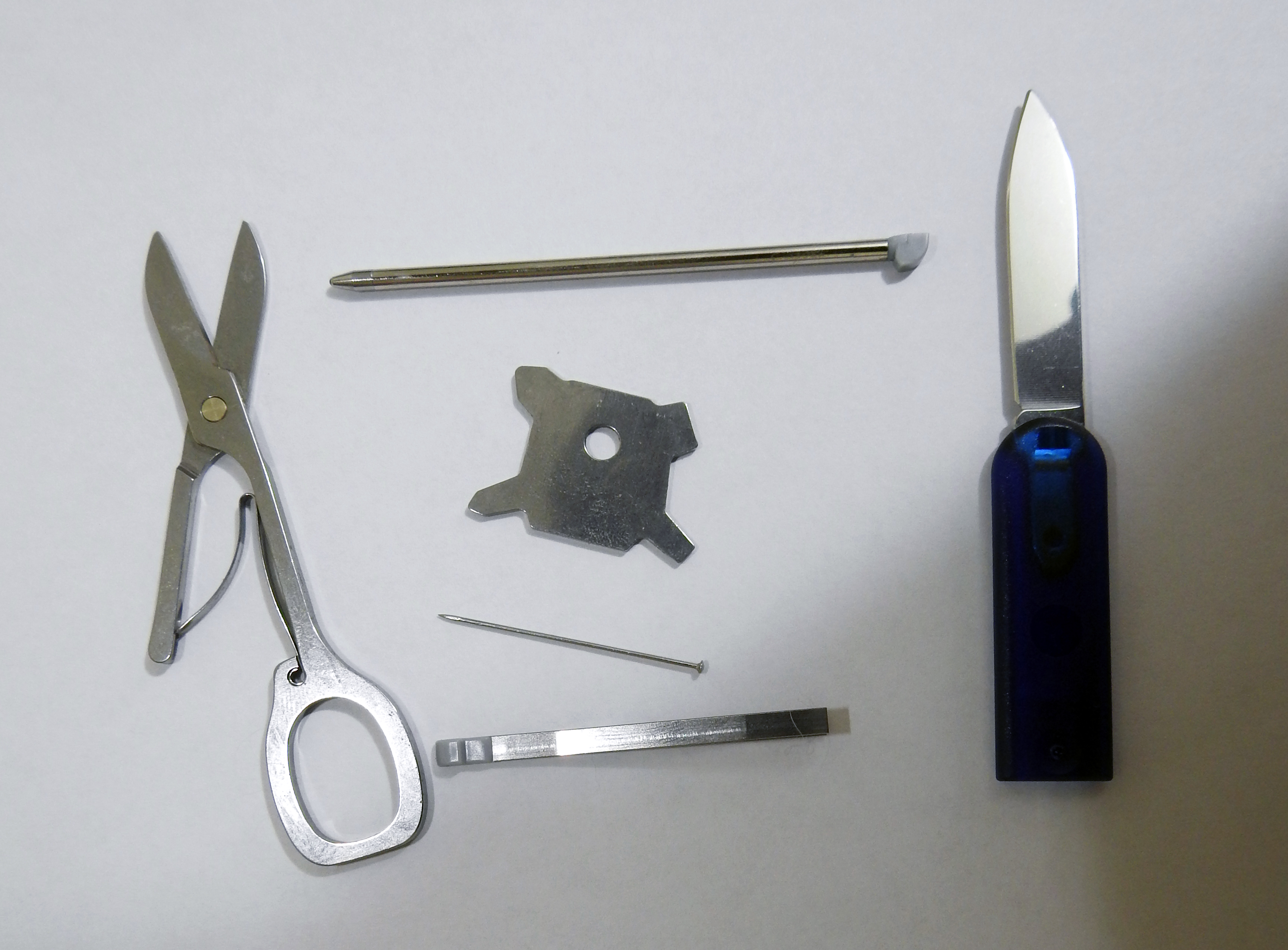
A SwissCard Lite, so named for including a flashlight with replaceable battery

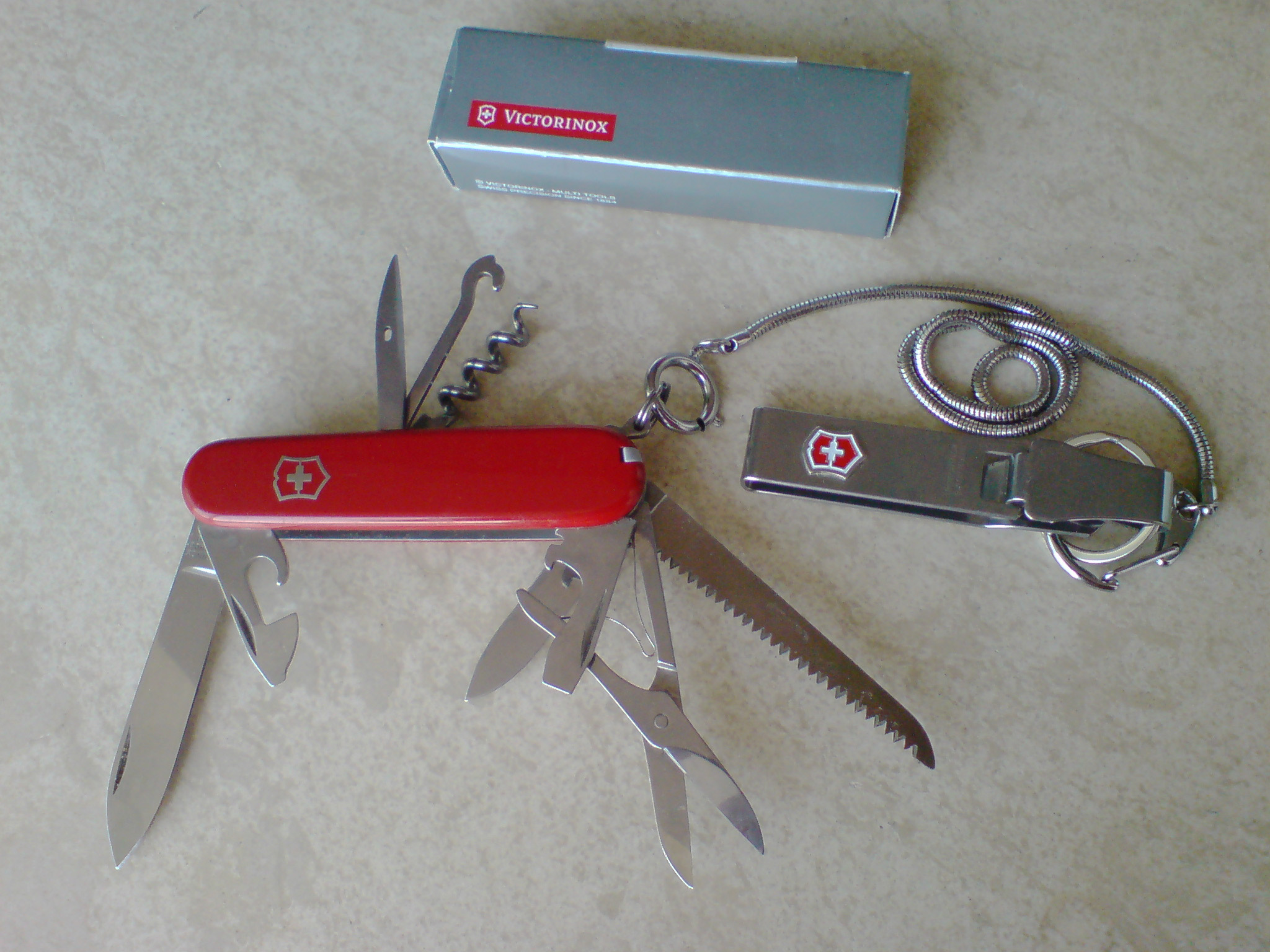
Victorinox "Huntsman" Swiss Army knife with knife chain and belt clip

The Swiss Army knife is the best-known product by Victorinox. Originally the sole supplier, Victorinox shared the military contract with Wenger between 1908 and their acquisition of Wenger in 2005. During the years when the Wenger brand was active, a compromise between the two companies gave Victorinox the right to advertise the "Original Swiss Army Knife", while Wenger laid claim to the title of "Genuine Swiss Army Knife".

Swiss Army knives are widely used outside the army, and civilian sales represent most of the turnover. They are multi-functional tools, and many sizes and functional combinations are produced.

NASA astronauts each have a Victorinox knife at their disposal as standard equipment. Victorinox knives have also been taken to Mount Everest and the Arctic as well.

The "Champion", Victorinox's flagship model, prior to the introduction of the "SwissChamp" in 1986, is displayed in the New York Museum of Modern Art's Permanent Design Collection.

=== SwissCard ===
The SwissCard is roughly the size of a business card, typically with a small pair of scissors, a short non-folding knife, a small file with a screwdriver point, a plastic toothpick, tweezers, a slim ballpoint pen, and a straight pin, housed in a hard plastic case of 82 × 54.5 x 4.5 mm in size, with an inch ruler on one side and metric measurements on the other.

Victorinox produces three types of SwissCards, the Classic, the Quattro and the Lite model. All three models differ in the number of functions they provide, ranging from 10 (Classic) to 13 functions (Quattro and Lite).

=== Cutlery ===
Victorinox has long produced other kitchen cutlery under their own name and the Forschner brand name.

In 2011 Victorinox stopped using the Forschner name and has since manufactured the same knives only with the Victorinox name.

=== Professional knives ===
Victorinox make a range of household and professional (NSF certified) food preparation knives.

They offer chef's knives, bread, carving, filleting, deboning, paring, Santoku and specialized knives such as a cheese knife. Victorinox models are made with molded plastic handles, wooden handles or riveted handles.

Most models have stamped blades, but one series has a forged bolster. They also have no ricasso – the flat section of the blade located at the junction of the blade and the heel.

Most models use stainless steel blades and one type is also available with ceramic blades.

=== Bayonets ===
Victorinox also produces the Sturmgewehr 90 bayonet for the Swiss Sturmgewehr 90 assault rifle.

The bayonet has an overall length of 310 mm and a muzzle ring diameter of 22 mm. The 177 mm long blade is single-edged and it has no fuller.

The bayonets were manufactured exclusively for the Swiss Army by both Wenger and Victorinox before the two companies merged.

=== Timepieces ===
In 1989, Victorinox entered the timepiece business in the United States under the brand name "Swiss Army".

Victorinox has various collections of watches which range from luxury dress watches to rugged diving watches. They feature mechanical and quartz movements. Collections include Infantry, Heritage, Divemaster, Airboss and I.N.O.X. The timepieces are all produced in Switzerland.

In 2014, Victorinox introduced the I.N.O.X. range of watches which it claims are resistant to high levels of shock, including being run over by a tank.

=== Luggage and clothing ===
Victorinox also produces luggage, backpacks, travel accessories, and watches branded as SwissGear, a brand introduced by Wenger.

In 2014, Victorinox acquired the TRG Group from Centric Group.

For several years, TRG Group was the Victorinox licensee for the manufacturing of luggage and travel-oriented products. Victorinox integrated TRG Group in the company as the Victorinox Travel Gear division.

In 2017, Victorinox decided to close the apparel division with the purpose of focusing in other core product lines.

=== Others ===
Victorinox produced a fashion line up until the late 1990s, but retired from this project in 2017.

In 2012, Victorinox licensed its name to luggage manufacturer TRG Accessories to produce branded travel gear and business accessories. Victorinox acquired TRG Accessories from Centric Group in 2014.

A number of Emissive Energy Corps products have been redesigned and rebranded as Victorinox LED flashlights.

Most are available with a knurled aluminium body, similar to Swiss Army knives. Similarly, SwissTools are Victorinox's multi-tools, i.e. a pair of pliers with other tools folded into the grips.

== Operation ==
=== North America ===
In 1972, the Forschner Butcher Scale Company of New Britain, Connecticut became the exclusive Victorinox distributor for the United States.

In 1981, the company went public, and Charles Elsener, president of Victorinox, acquired a significant percentage of its shares. In 1983, it was renamed the Forschner Group, Inc. In the 1980s, Forschner registered the Swiss Army name as a trademark in the United States.

In 1992, Precise Imports Corp., a U.S. and Canadian importer of Wenger knives, sued and Forschner retained the rights to use the trademark on its compasses, timepieces, and sunglasses, while Precise could use it in marketing other non-knife items. In the mid-1990s, Forschner changed its name to Swiss Army Brands, Inc. (SABI).

In 2001, Victorinox teamed up with SABI to establish an international watch company, Victorinox Swiss Army Watch AG. In August 2002, Victorinox acquired all remaining shares of SABI to gain control of the Swiss Army trademark.

Previously, SABI had sold the Swiss Army branded watch in North America and—under the license—the Victorinox branded watch outside North America. But afterwards, the combined Victorinox Swiss Army brand has been marketed worldwide.

== 2018 trademark dispute with Swiss defence authorities ==
In 2018, Victorinox marketed a perfume under the name "Swiss Army", and registered "Swiss Army" and "Swiss Military" as trademarks under US law. In October 2018, the Swiss Federal Office for Defence Procurement (Armasuisse) sued Victorinox, demanding the removal of these trademarks from the marketplace. The context of the lawsuit included a 2012 parliamentary motion by state councillor Thomas Minder requesting the active protection of trademarks such as "Swiss Army", "Swiss Military" or "Swiss Air Force" on the part of the federal authorities. Victorinox argued that it does own the (English-language) trademarks "Swiss Army" and "Swiss Military".

== Gallery ==
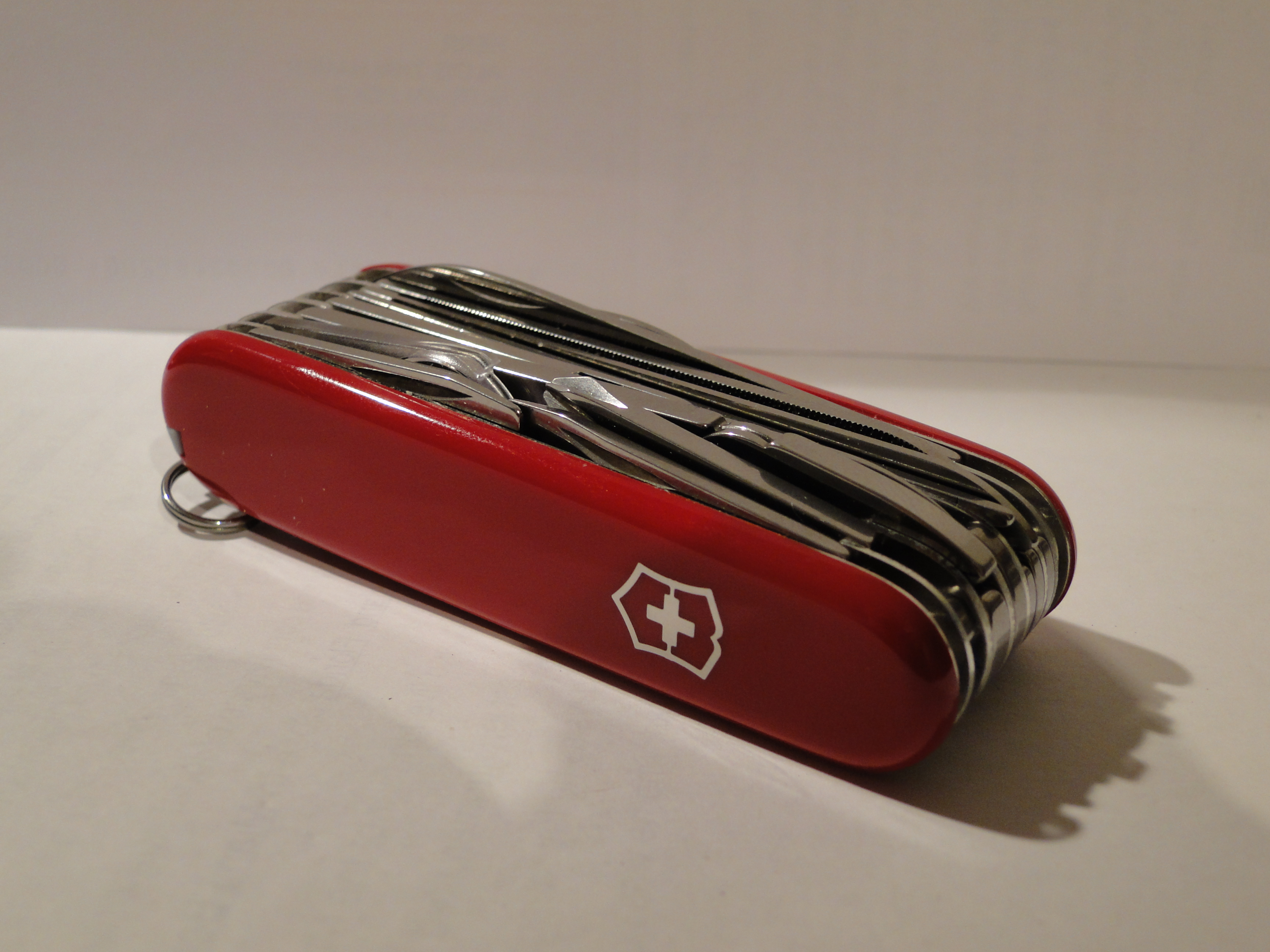
"Victorinox SwissChamp", with multiple tools

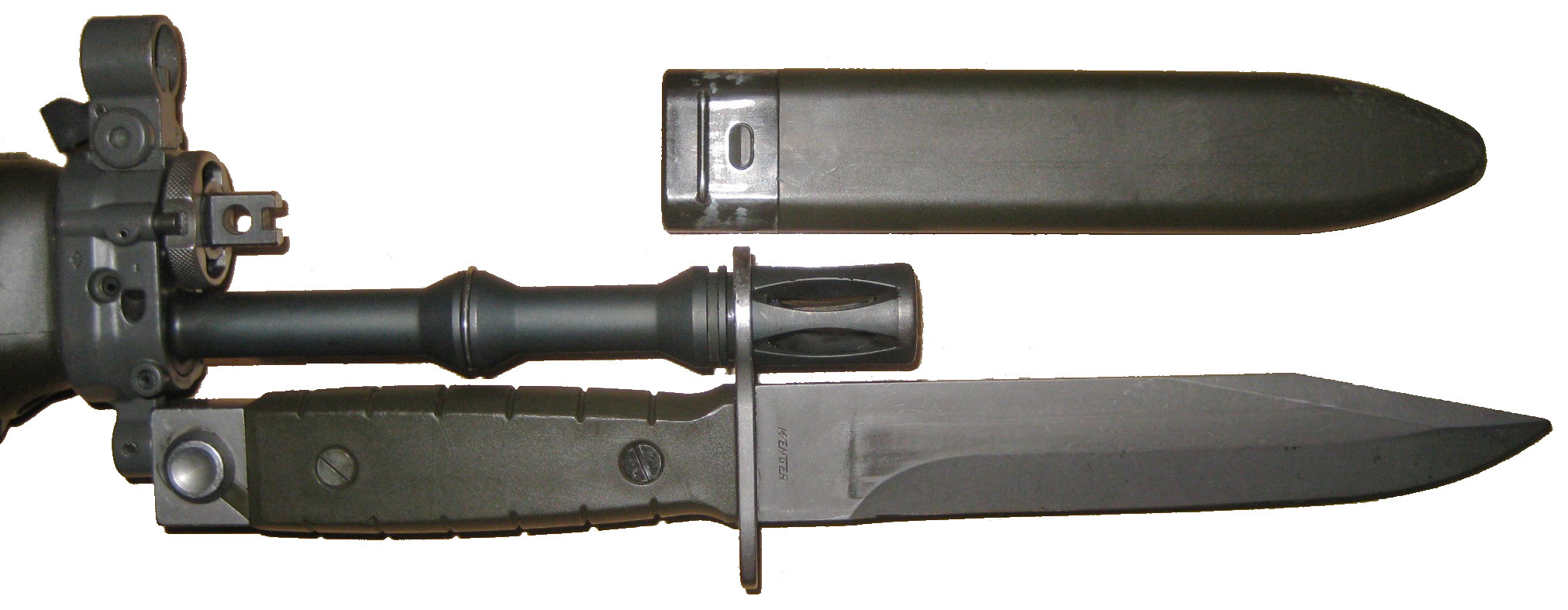
Bayonet for the Sturmgewehr 90, as issued by the Swiss Army

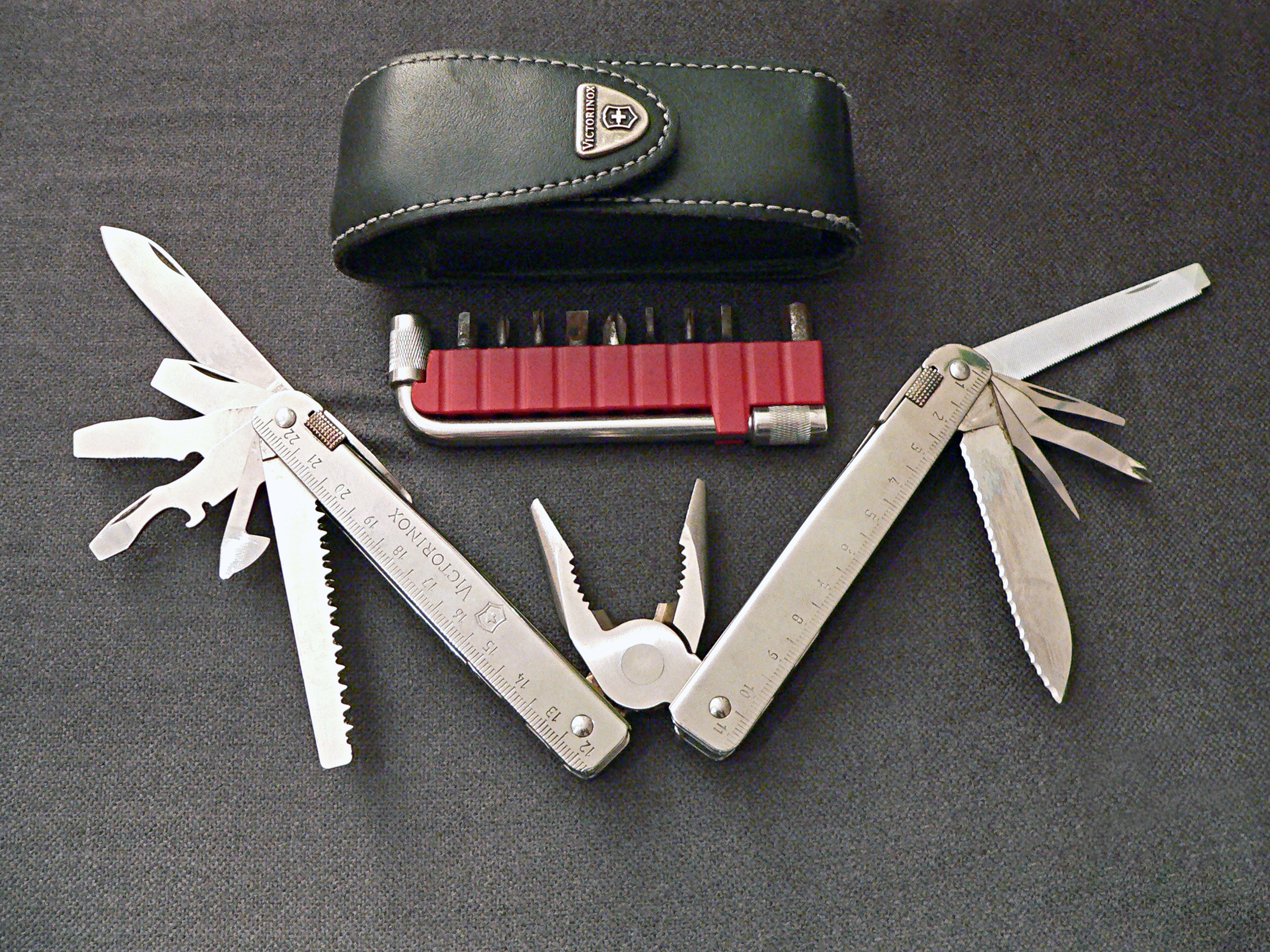
Victorinox SwissTool multi-tool

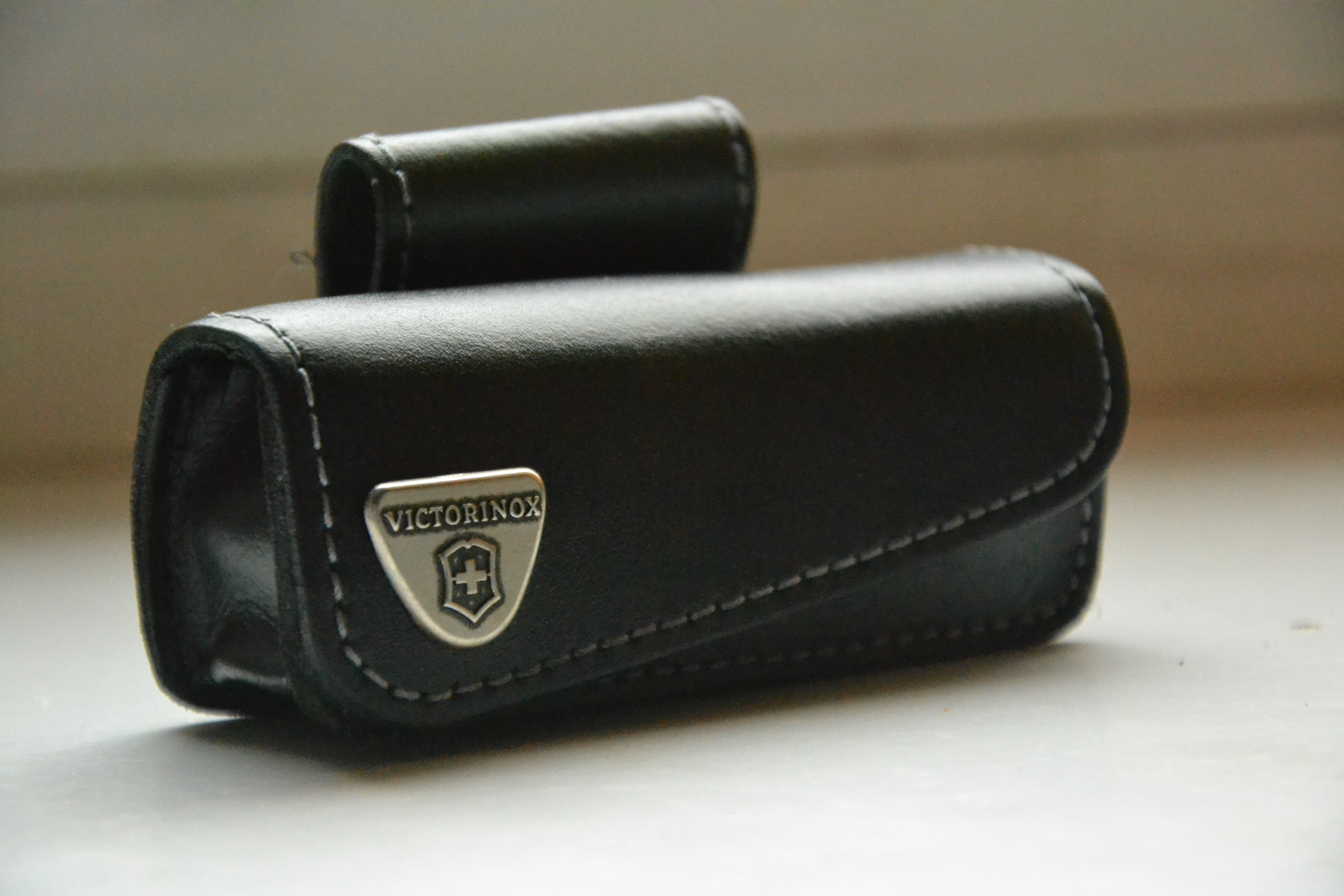
Victorinox knife pouch

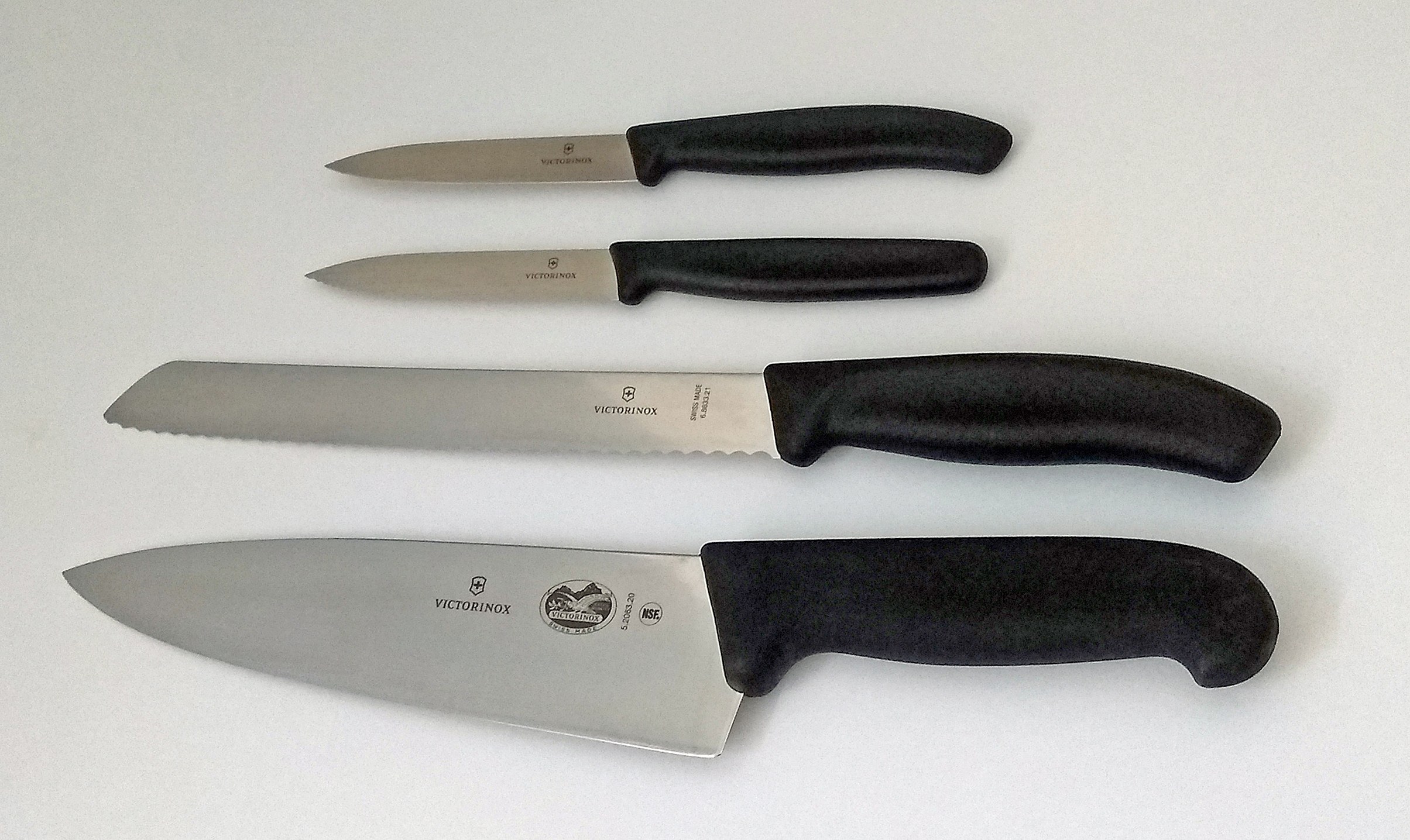
Victorinox kitchen cutlery

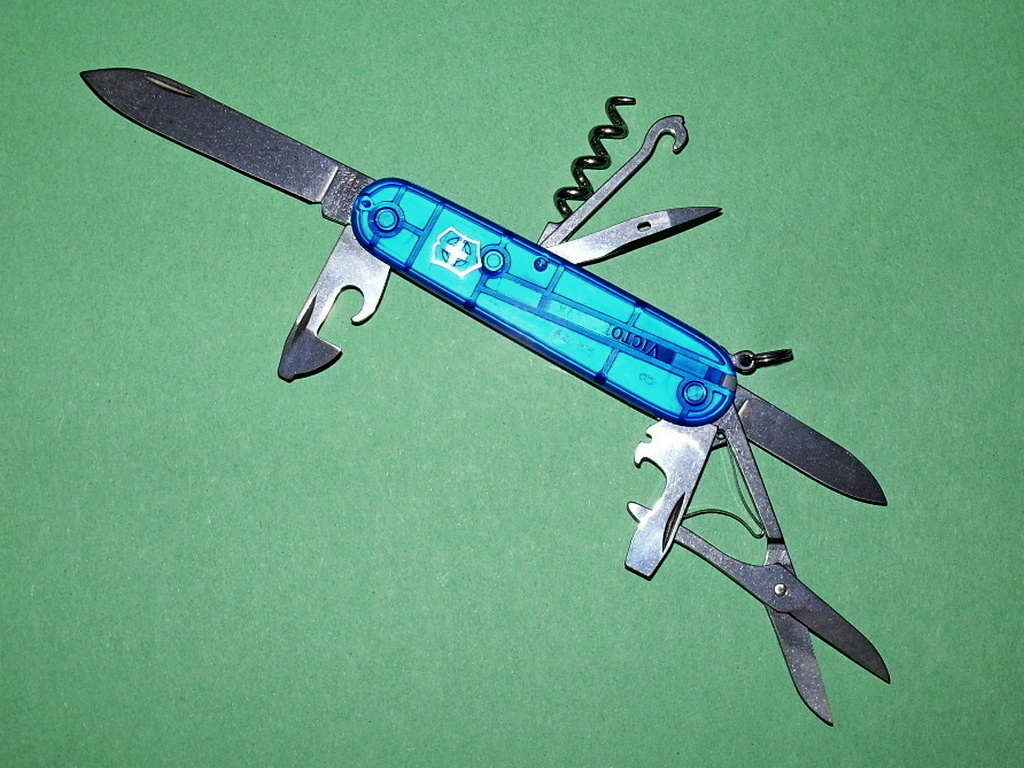
Victorinox Climber

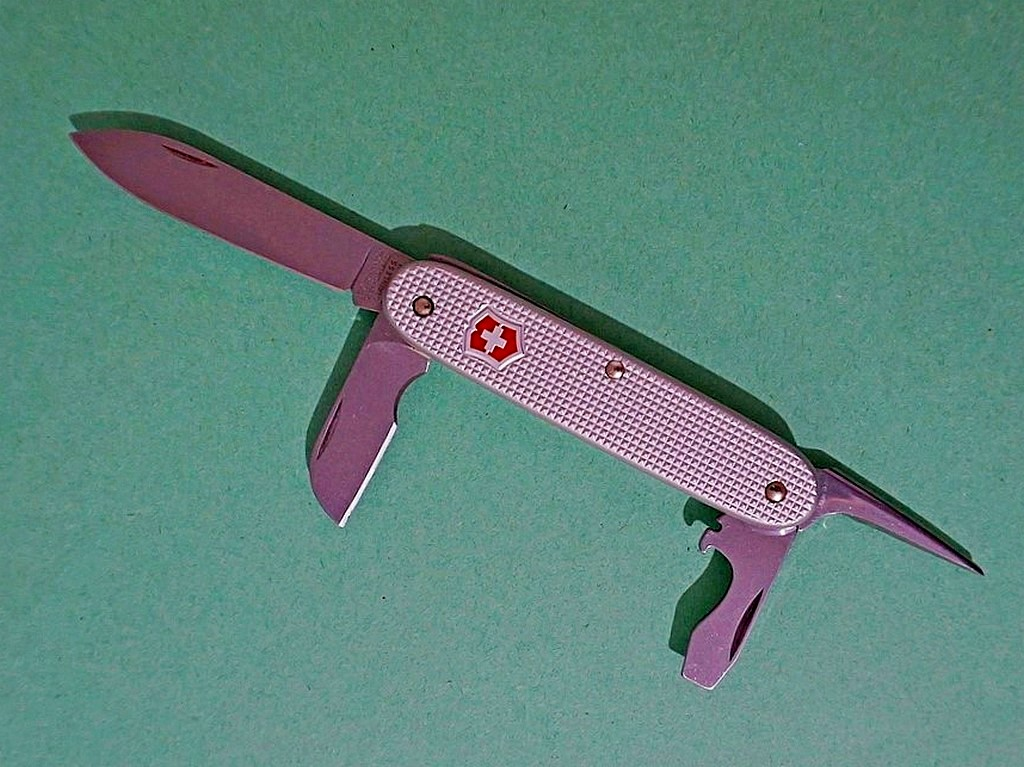
Victorinox Electrician

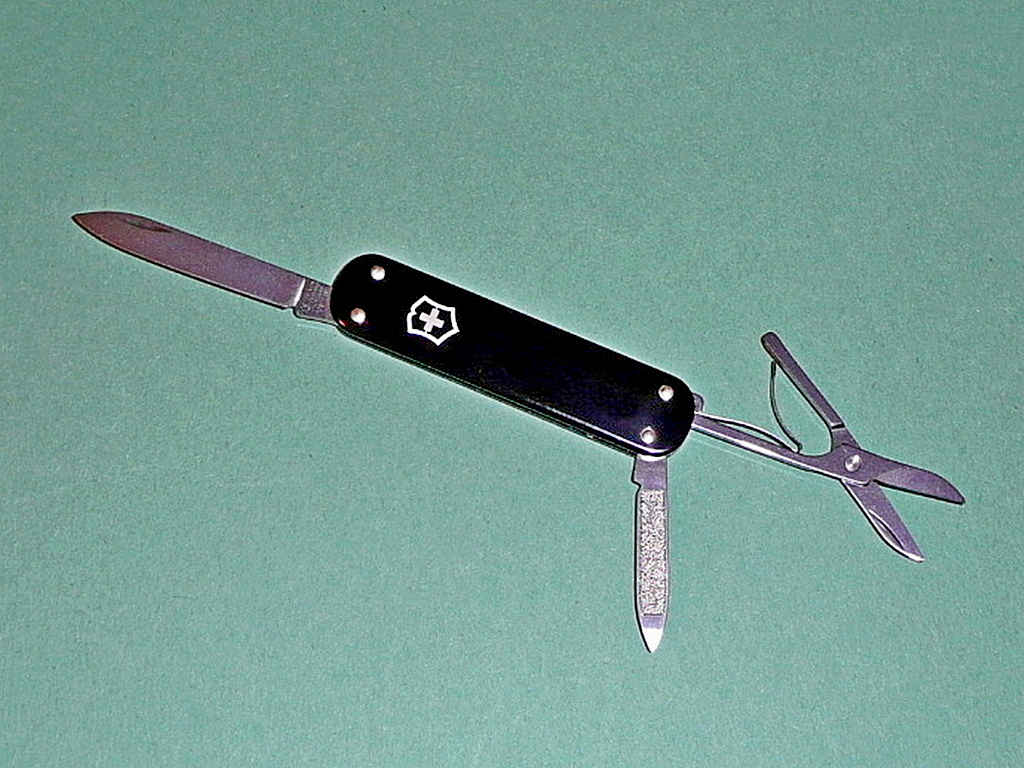
Victorinox Money-Clip

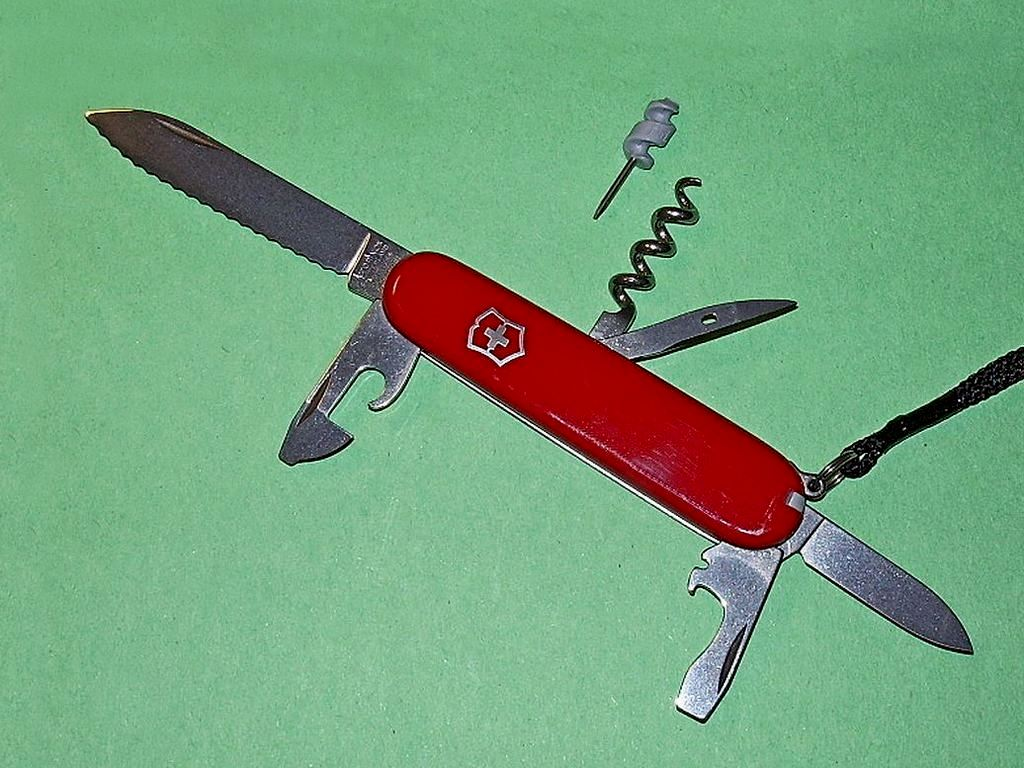
Victorinox Weekender

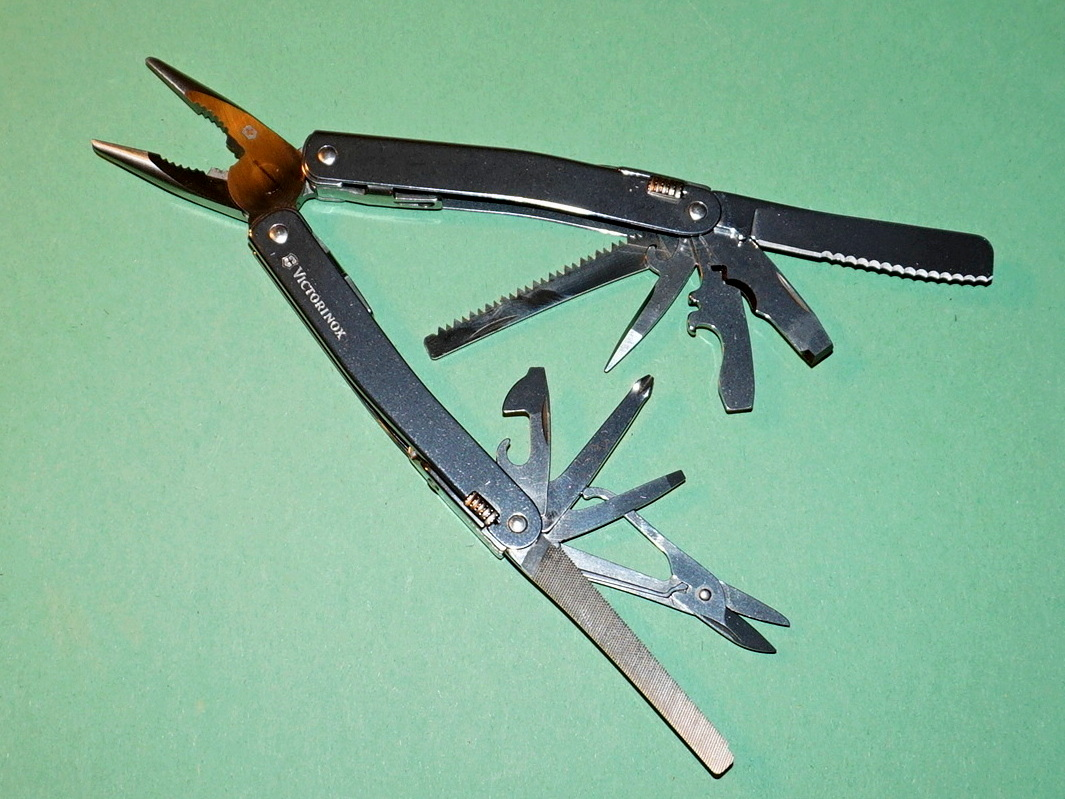
Victorinox Spirit

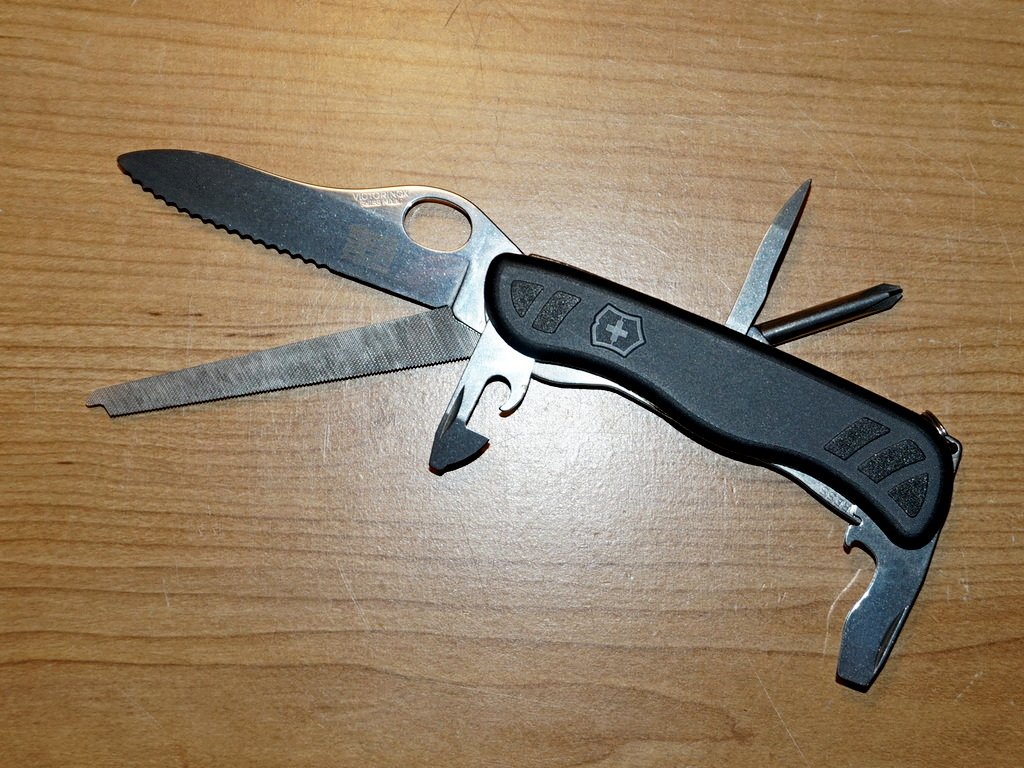
Victorinox One-Hand Master RT

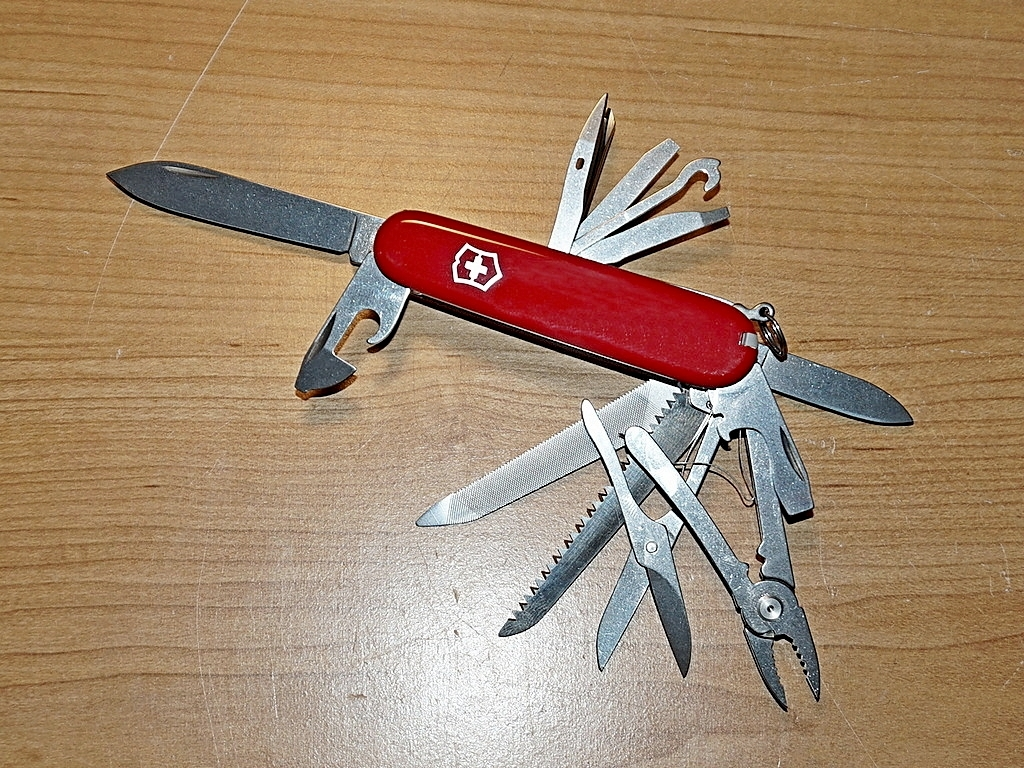
Victorinox Craftsman

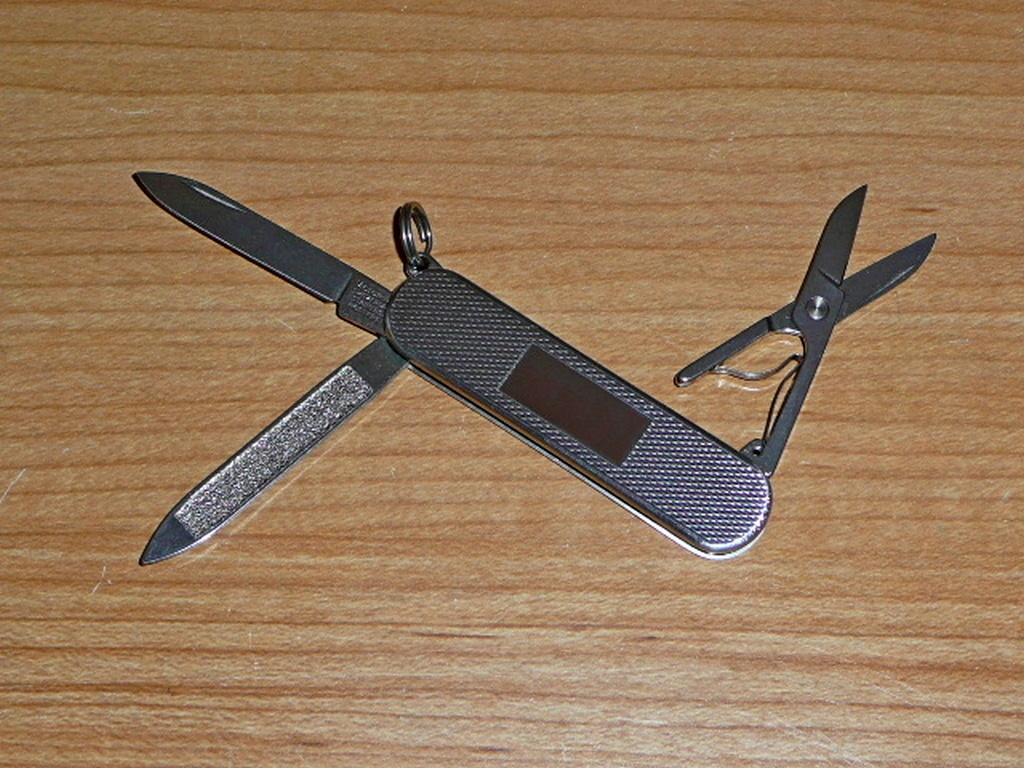
Victorinox Broker

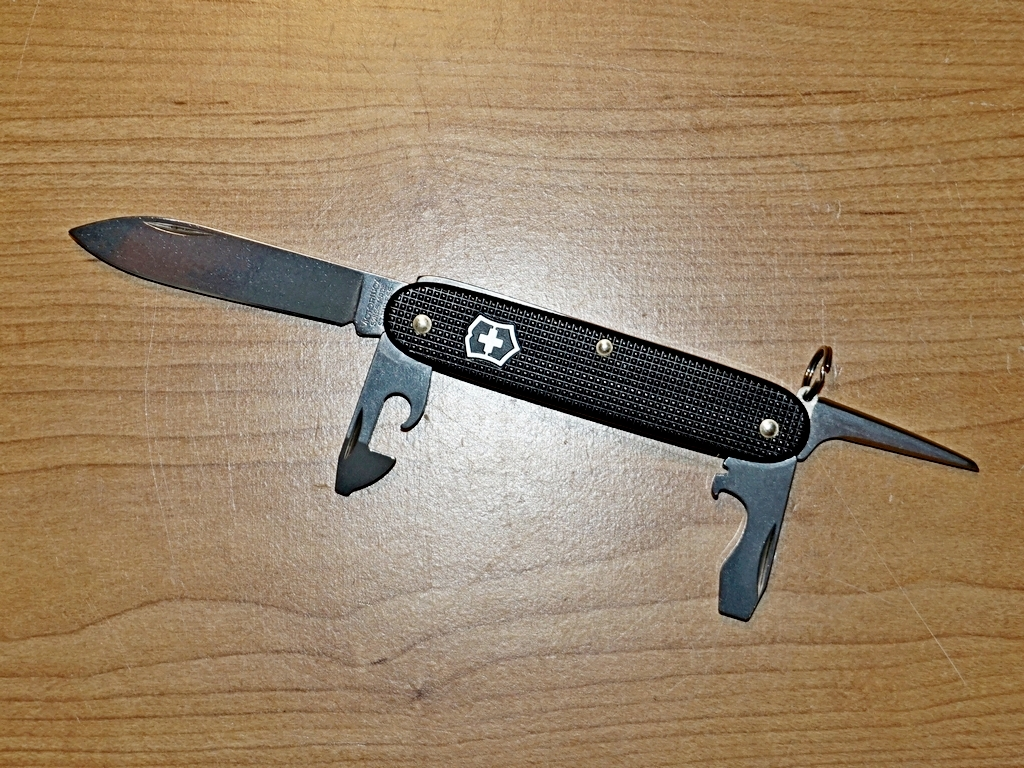
Victorinox Pioneer

== See also ==
- Gerber multitool
- Leatherman
- Swiss made
- Wenger
