= Indaial =

Place in Santa Catarina, Brazil

- Flag Coat of arms

- Location of Indaial

- Location within Brazil
- Coordinates: 26°53′52″S 49°13′55″W
- Country: Brazil
- Region: South
- State: (Santa Catarina (state)) Santa Catarina
- Founded: February 28, 1934

Government
  - Mayor: André Moser 2020~present (PL)

Area
  - Total: 430.534 km^{2} (166.230 sq mi)
- Elevation: 64 m (210 ft)

Population (2020)
  - Total: 70,900
  - Density: 110.6/km^{2} (286/sq mi)
- Time zone: UTC-3 (UTC-3)
  - Summer (DST): UTC-2 (UTC-2)
- HDI (2000): 0.825
- Website: indaial.atende.net

Indaial is a city in the state of Santa Catarina, Brazil. It is located on the left bank of Itajaí River, and 160 km from the capital of the state, Florianópolis.

The city is of European origin, with many textiles industries and strong agricultural activity. It was colonized about 1860 by Germans, Italians and Poles. Before the colonization it was populated by Tapajós and Carijós Indians, that are now names of two big neighborhoods in Indaial.

== Climate ==
Climate data for Indaial (1981–2010, extremes 1976–2005)
| Month | Jan | Feb | Mar | Apr | May | Jun | Jul | Aug | Sep | Oct | Nov | Dec | Year |
|---|---|---|---|---|---|---|---|---|---|---|---|---|---|
| Record high °C (°F) | 39.0 (102.2) | 39.3 (102.7) | 37.4 (99.3) | 37.2 (99.0) | 34.4 (93.9) | 32.2 (90.0) | 31.0 (87.8) | 33.6 (92.5) | 35.9 (96.6) | 36.0 (96.8) | 38.2 (100.8) | 40.3 (104.5) | 40.3 (104.5) |
| Mean daily maximum °C (°F) | 31.1 (88.0) | 31.3 (88.3) | 30.5 (86.9) | 27.9 (82.2) | 24.4 (75.9) | 22.3 (72.1) | 21.5 (70.7) | 23.3 (73.9) | 23.7 (74.7) | 25.9 (78.6) | 28.5 (83.3) | 30.4 (86.7) | 26.7 (80.1) |
| Daily mean °C (°F) | 24.7 (76.5) | 24.7 (76.5) | 24.0 (75.2) | 21.6 (70.9) | 17.9 (64.2) | 16.3 (61.3) | 15.7 (60.3) | 17.0 (62.6) | 18.3 (64.9) | 20.4 (68.7) | 22.3 (72.1) | 23.9 (75.0) | 20.6 (69.1) |
| Mean daily minimum °C (°F) | 20.7 (69.3) | 20.9 (69.6) | 20.1 (68.2) | 17.8 (64.0) | 14.3 (57.7) | 12.9 (55.2) | 12.2 (54.0) | 13.1 (55.6) | 14.9 (58.8) | 17.0 (62.6) | 18.3 (64.9) | 19.7 (67.5) | 16.8 (62.2) |
| Record low °C (°F) | 14.2 (57.6) | 15.0 (59.0) | 10.0 (50.0) | 6.4 (43.5) | 4.4 (39.9) | −1.2 (29.8) | −2.0 (28.4) | 3.0 (37.4) | 2.2 (36.0) | 5.2 (41.4) | 8.4 (47.1) | 11.4 (52.5) | −2.0 (28.4) |
| Average precipitation mm (inches) | 243.3 (9.58) | 179.2 (7.06) | 126.6 (4.98) | 109.1 (4.30) | 105.8 (4.17) | 106.3 (4.19) | 125.4 (4.94) | 90.6 (3.57) | 161.3 (6.35) | 167.4 (6.59) | 156.4 (6.16) | 165.6 (6.52) | 1,737 (68.39) |
| Average precipitation days (≥ 1.0 mm) | 16 | 14 | 12 | 8 | 8 | 7 | 9 | 7 | 12 | 13 | 12 | 12 | 130 |
| Average relative humidity (%) | 83.5 | 85.2 | 85.7 | 85.7 | 86.8 | 88.2 | 87.6 | 86.2 | 85.8 | 84.8 | 82.3 | 81.8 | 85.3 |
| Mean monthly sunshine hours | 151.0 | 140.3 | 152.4 | 135.6 | 136.1 | 118.1 | 123.8 | 128.2 | 89.9 | 101.6 | 136.3 | 122.1 | 1,535.4 |
Source 1: Instituto Nacional de Meteorologia
Source 2: Empresa Brasileira de Pesquisa Agropecuária (EMBRAPA)
