= Ibach, Switzerland =

Ibach
- Village
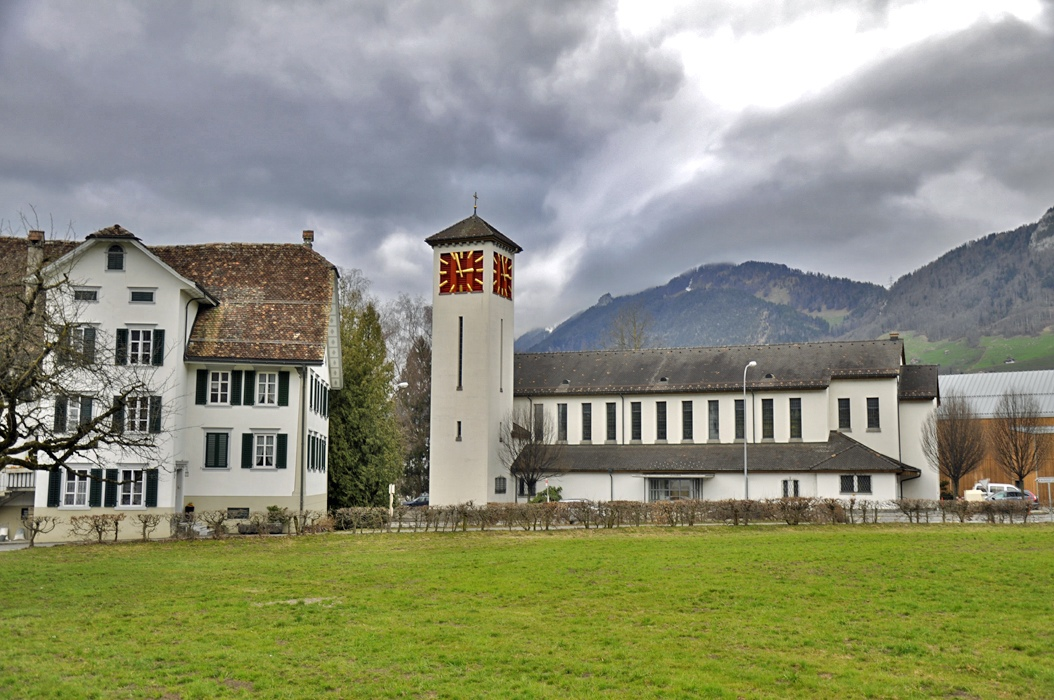
- Ibach parish church

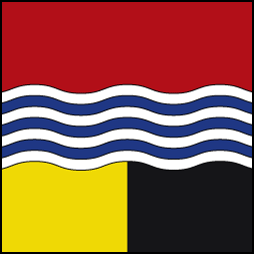
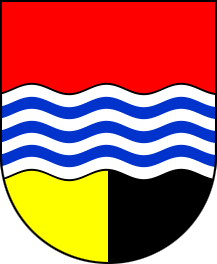
- Flag Coat of arms
- Interactive map of Ibach
- Coordinates: 47°0′40.6″N 8°38′40.1″E
- Country: Switzerland
- Canton: Schwyz
- Municipality: Schwyz

Ibach (German pronunciation: [ˈiːbax]) is a village in the municipality of Schwyz, itself in the canton of Schwyz in Switzerland. It lies some 1.5 km (0.93 mi) to the south of the town centre of Schwyz, at the point where the road from Schwyz to Brunnen bridges the Muota river.

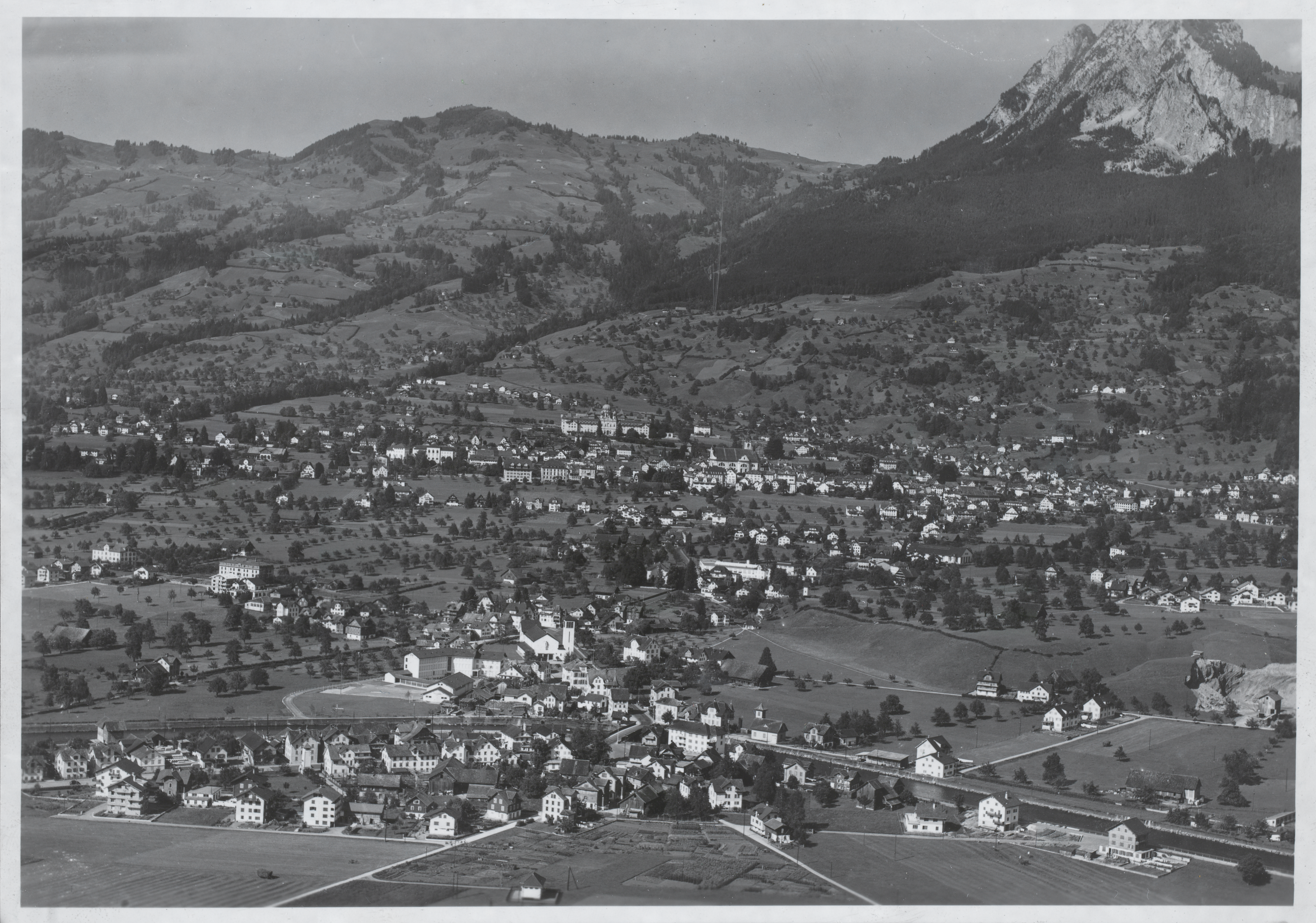
Aerial view (1954)

A Swiss knife manufacturer Victorinox, known for its Swiss Army knives, was founded in Ibach, where it operates to this day.

== Sports ==
FC Ibach is the village's football team.
