= Gerber multitool =

Brand of pocket tools

A "Multiplier 400 Compact Sport" Gerber multi-tool, in the open position, with all tools partially opened.

Gerber multitools are a line of compact multitools made by Gerber Legendary Blades, part of the Fiskars Corporation.

There are similarities and differences between Gerber multitools and tools made by Leatherman. Some of the Gerber tools are accessed by opening the handles, but no longer unique to Gerber is a system in which the pliers slide straight out from the end. The sliding Safe-T-Loc system (similar to the Blackie Collins "Bolt Action" lock) locks each tool securely in place.

Different sizes of Gerber multitools are available, with various combinations of components from the mundane (screwdrivers) to the esoteric (demolition detonator crimps), and from the key-chain sized, like the "Shortcut", to hefty, 8-ounce (227 g) models like the "Diesel".

The company is based in Portland, Oregon, USA. It was acquired by Fiskars in 1986. Portland remains the headquarters of the Finnish company's outdoor recreation group.

== Gallery ==
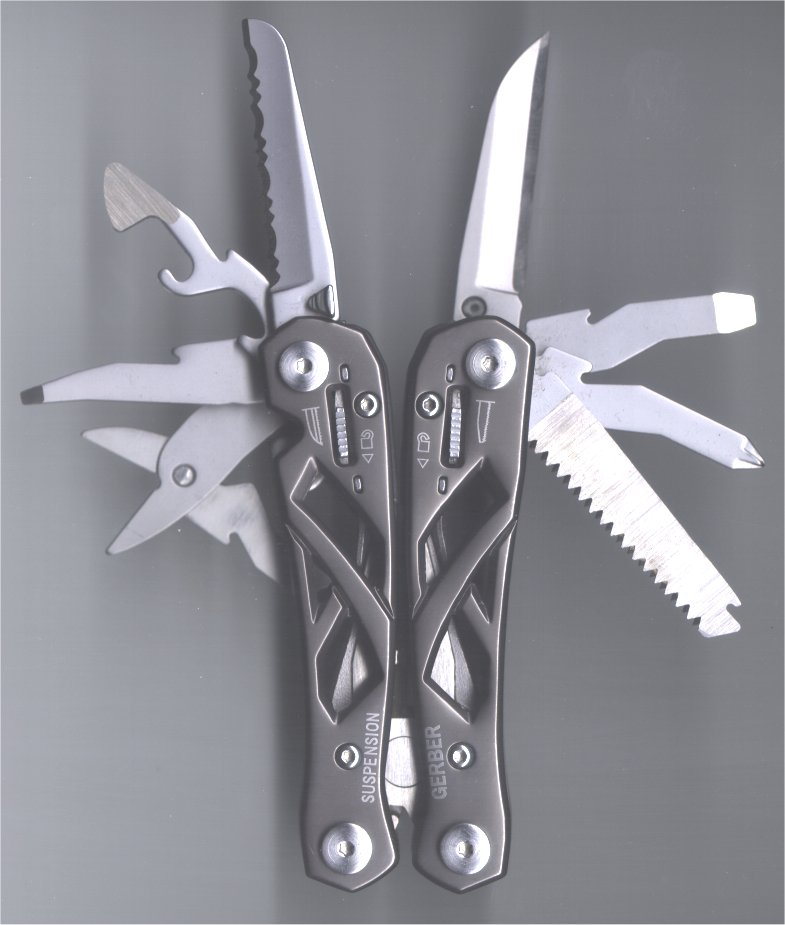
A Gerber "Suspension" multi-tool, with skeleton handle and locking blades. Blades are accessible with tool closed, and knife blades have a thumb stud for one handed opening.

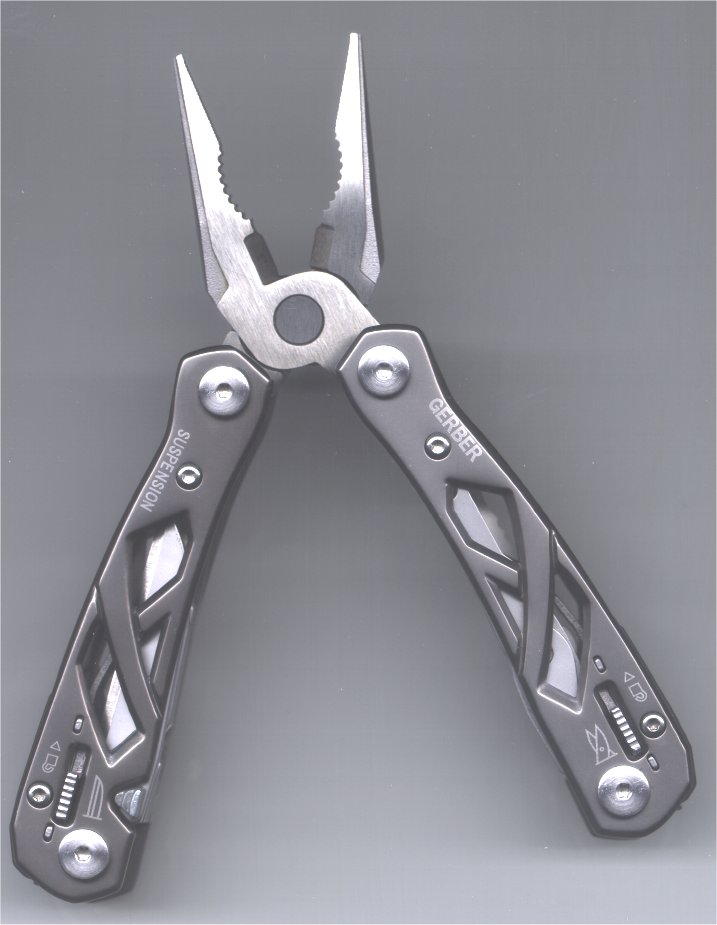
A Gerber "Suspension" multi-tool, with pliers open. Pliers are spring-loaded, for easy use.

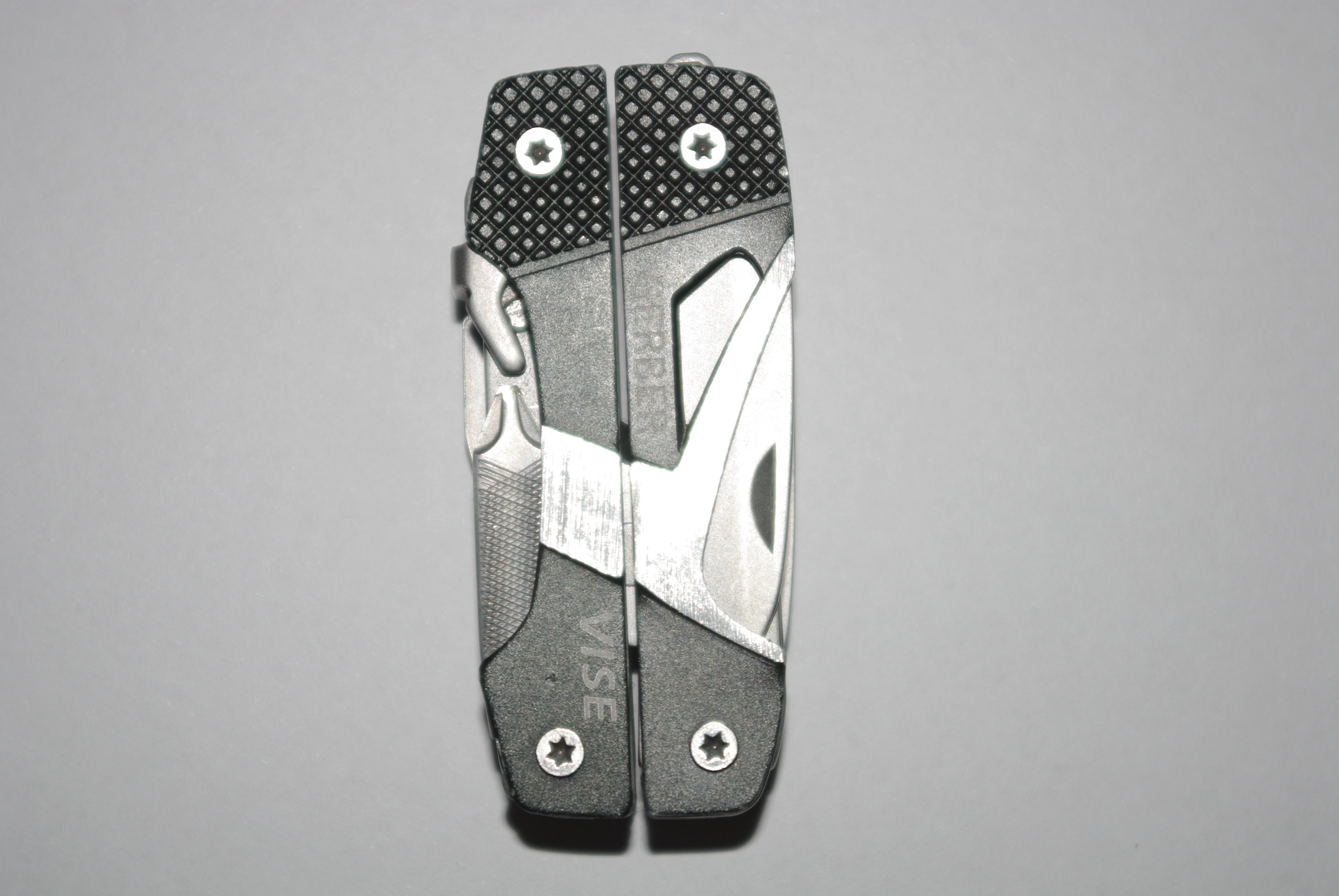
Gerber Vise Keychain, 60mm when closed

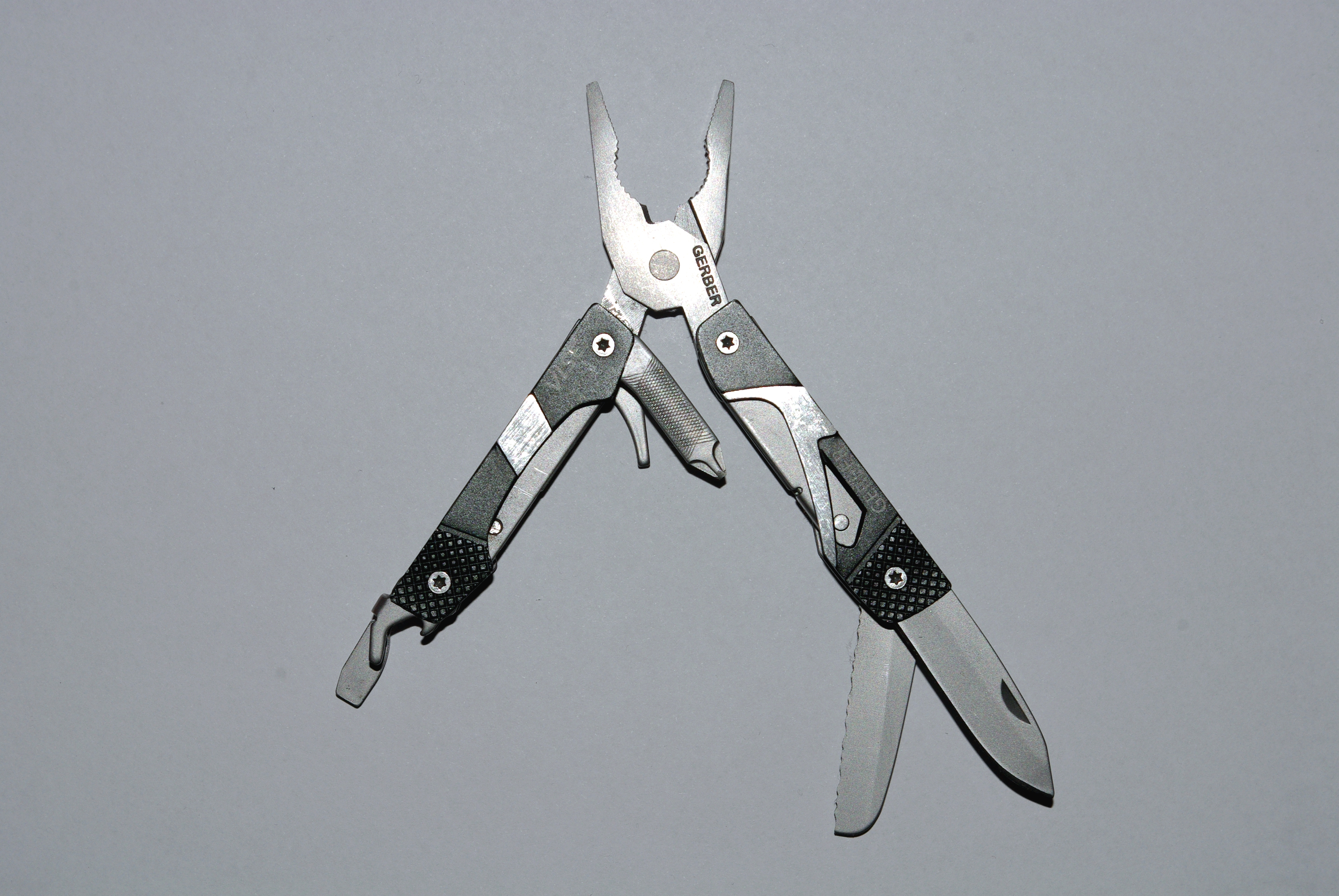
Gerber Vise, fully opened

== See also ==
- Leatherman
- Victorinox
- Wenger
