= Patagonian Expedition Race =

Adventure racing

The Patagonian Expedition Race is an annual endurance adventure race that takes place in the remote wilderness of Chilean Patagonia, run to help protect and raise awareness about the fragile environment in this region. Known as the 'Race to the End of the World', the 10-day event challenges co-ed international teams of four athletes in the disciplines of trekking, sea kayaking, orienteering, and mountain biking. The race takes place on a different course each year, with competitors using a map and compass to navigate through previously unknown terrain. Due to its challenging nature, it is also known as 'The Last Wild Race', and has been described as 'The World's toughest adventure race' and the ‘Dakar’ of adventure racing. The 13th edition of the race took place from 17 to 30 November 2018.

== Description ==
The Patagonian Expedition Race takes place in February each year and involves a maximum of 20 four-person mixed-sex teams, limited to minimize the impact on the environment. Created by geologist Stjepan Pavicic, a pioneer of Chilean Patagonia, the first race was run in 2004 and since then athletes from 26 different nations have taken part. It is the only adventure race worldwide that has been granted an official partnership by an Olympic Committee.

Each edition takes place on a different course through the most remote and untouched regions of Chilean Patagonia. The terrain in this region is incredibly diverse and includes the mountains of Torres del Paine and the Cordillera Darwin, the flat plains and rolling hills of Tierra del Fuego and Isla Riesco, and the icy waterways of the Strait of Magellan and the Beagle Channel.

The combination of rugged terrain, long distances and unpredictable climatic conditions creates a great challenge, with the rate of team completion averaging between 35 and 50 percent. There is usually only a summer edition (February), but in 2006 a winter edition was organized, which took place in June.

The 26 nations that have competed, up to and including the 2011 edition, are: Argentina, Australia, Belgium, Brazil, Canada, Chile, Columbia, Czech Republic, Denmark, Finland, France, Germany, Great Britain, Japan, Kazakhstan, Mexico, New Zealand, Norway, Russia, South Africa, Spain, Sweden, Switzerland, Turkey, Uruguay and USA. The race is organized by NIGSA (Nómadas International Group S.A.), formerly known as, Nómadas Outdoor Services Ltda., an organization located in Punta Arenas, working for the goals of environmental protection and the advancement of eco-tourism in the region of Chilean Patagonia.

== Goals of the Race ==
The mission of the race is to raise international awareness of the fragile environment of Chilean Patagonia. It promotes the area's unique and pristine wilderness, as well as its rich cultural heritage as attractions for a viable sustainable tourism destination.

Stjepan Pavicic, Race Director, explains: "From the beginning, we have focused on creating an experience that is not only a physical and mental challenge, but one that sends a real message: we must protect and preserve this remote and pristine region of Chilean Patagonia. Our event brings this message to the world."

For centuries, the extreme isolation of the southernmost region of South America has been a favorable characteristic for the preservation of its flora and fauna. However, in recent decades, devastation of extensive areas of these southern forests has occurred. The Patagonian Expedition Race focuses on working to avoid the exploitation of natural resources by non-sustainable industrial activities.

Important sections of the 2004, 2006 Winter, 2008 and 2010 races passed through the Karukinka reserve on Tierra del Fuego, a 300,000 ha conservation area owned by the Wildlife Conservation Society (WCS). This is the largest terrain of its kind and holds one of the last protected sub-Antarctic forest reserves on earth. The race has brought to attention the necessity to protect this distinct region. The organization behind the Patagonian Expedition Race, NIGSA, is now active in its trail building projects within Karukinka. Eventually the new trails will allow international tourists access to this region's unique features, increasing eco-tourism in Chilean Patagonia.

== Awards ==
The race produces an annual documentary showing the struggles and experiences of the teams participating in the Patagonian Expedition Race. Produced and directed by Brian J. Leitten, the 2011 edition of the documentary called 'The Last Wild Race' received huge international media attention and was recognized seven times at the following global film festivals:

Winner BEST ENVIRONMENTAL FILM: Colorado Film Festival of 2011

Winner BEST ENVIRONMENTAL FILM: Yosemite Film Festival of 2011

Winner BEST MOVIE: Vanka Regule, Croatia Film Festival 2011

Winner of Adventure Sport Category: Killarney Adventure Film Festival 2011

Finalist: New Zealand Mountain Film Festival 2011

OFFICIAL SELECTION: Breckenridge Festival of Film 2011

OFFICIAL SELECTION: Danish Adventure Film Festival 2011

== History ==
Since the Patagonian Expedition Race was founded in 2004, courses have ranged from 320 miles (520 km) to 680 miles (1112 km), with completion targets from 9 to 14 days.

The popularity and awareness of the event has increased since its inception in 2004, with increasing features in many international magazines, newspapers, websites and TV broadcasts. The race secured its first title sponsor in 2009, with Switzerland-based company Wenger, the manufacturer of the Genuine Swiss Army Knife. At this point, the logo was altered to carry Wenger's Swiss flag emblem and the name was changed to the Wenger Patagonian Expedition Race.

== Editions ==
2012: The 10th anniversary edition of the race presented the 19 international co-ed teams with 565 km (351 miles) of challenging Patagonian nature; ranging from strength-sapping peat bogs to freezing cold glacial rivers. Part of the route also led them to the Kurukinka National Park where NIGSA has recently ended a trail building project, allowing walkers and rangers to effectively reach some of the more remote parts of the area. The route took the teams from the regional capital, Punta Arenas to the eventual finish on the Fiordo Pia on the Beagle Channel. For the fourth year in a row British based team Adidas TERREX/Prunesco were the overall winners. The second and third step on the podium respectively went to Japanese team EastWind and the American team Gearjunkie/YogaSlackers.

2011: The ninth edition of the Wenger Patagonian Expedition Race took on a challenging route through the dramatic landscapes of Torres del Paine, Bernard O’Higgins and Pali Aike National Parks. The race involved a total of 248 km of mountain biking, 150 km of trailless trekking and 105 km of river and sea kayaking. British team adidasTERREX/Prunesco completed their third consecutive victory, while persistent rain forced a section of the course to be cancelled, and swollen rivers caused three teams to be airlifted over an impassable part of the course (two of which completed the race). British team captain Bruce Duncan said: "To have won this race once is something special, to win it three times is simply amazing". Six teams completed the challenging course, with US team GearJunkie.com taking second place, French team Vaucluse Adventure Evasions finishing third and Croatians Ad Natura taking fourth place. Karibu finished several hours behind the top placed teams, while teams East Wind from Japan, and Perdido en el Turbal, from the US and UK, were the final finishers.

2010: This was the southernmost adventure race in history and was won by reigning champions Helly Hansen-Prunesco, making them the first team to retain the title. "It was a magical race," said team captain Nicola MacLeod. The route began on the north western shore of Tierra del Fuego and took competitors south on a series of treks and mountain bike rides through increasingly hilly terrain to the Wildlife Conservation Society's Karukinka Reserve before a major 120 km trek through the unexplored Darwin Range to Yendegaia Bay and a final kayak and trek the finish on Isla Navarino, on the shores of the Beagle Channel. Stephen Regenold, of Team GearJunkie.com, said: "We saw every type of terrain you could imagine. It looked like New Zealand, the Alps, Colorado, there were jungly sections and the Turba (peatbog) was crazy – it looked like the set from the movie Avatar. We didn’t see any sign that humans had been through there, and we didn’t even see any other teams for days". Helly Hansen-Prunesco's winning time was five days, six hours and eight minutes, with Spain's Air Europa Bimont 16hrs 38mins behind in second, and Germany's Team Herbertz and Team Switzerland sharing third. Seven teams completed the course.

2009: This 600 km epic began in Torres del Paine and ended at the Cross of the Seas on Cabo Froward, the southernmost point of the American continental mainland. It was notable for its tough conditions and for several race dramas. British team Helly Hansen-Prunesco put in a strong and smooth performance to beat reigning champions Easy Implant (formerly Authentic Nutrition), who finished second. Team captain Nicola MacLeod said: "It was an amazing race, a chance to explore Patagonia in depth, on your own, in an adventurous environment. It certainly met my expectations, and the fact we managed to win it blew them away!” But the race became famous for the dramatic story of American team Calleva, who got stuck in the mountains after a trekking short-cut went wrong and had to survive for days on wild berries before two team members attempted a daring swim and free-climb to alert a rescue operation. Team member Druce Finlay admitted "it was freezing water and after we got out we shivered all night. I couldn’t dress myself, I just couldn't operate my hands. I thought I was going down. But the very end climb, we got a lucky path although we were on some slippery steep cliffs, no ropes, just grabbing onto thin grass here and there". They made it – but were out of time to be classified. Just three of the nine teams made the finish.

2008: This edition of the race focused on Tierra del Fuego with more than 500 km of competition across the remote Chilean island. Team Authentic Nutrition became the third French team to win the race after a route that took racers from Porvenir through valleys and forests within the Karukinka reserve, the Death Pass in the Darwin Range, to Yendegaia, where the race was finished early due to strong winds impeding helicopter flights. The winning team completed the course in six days two hours and 42 minutes. Two team members of second-placed Spanish team Canarias – Andalucia Spiuk Tenerife had taken on the event as part of their honeymoon having been married just before the race to gain a legal holiday. Only two other teams of the 11 that started made it to the finish.

2007: The longest race of its kind in history took the teams 1,112 km through the southern region of Chilean Patagonia, from Torres del Paine National Park all the way to Puerto Williams on the Navarino Island. The awesome challenge was won by returning champions French team TSL – La Clusaz – and no other team was able to complete the course. The Mexican team 7º Grado Monterrey México came closest, but they had been disqualified for being rescued from the middle of the awesome Darwin mountains after getting lost for several days.

2006 Winter: The only winter race took place between 21 and 26 June 2006 and was contested mostly by Chilean and Argentine teams, with victory going to Chilean team Nike-GNC. A unique alteration to the race regulations saw teams made up of just two members and the race split into distinct stages with overnight rests. The cold but sunny and clear winter days with strong light contrasts created an extremely scenic edition on a route that started at Glacier Grey in the Torres del Paine National Park, and finished at Lago Deseado in Tierra del Fuego, including several days of racing through the Karukinka Reserve. The race was completed in 28 hours, 57 minutes and 18 seconds, with eight teams making the finish.

2006: The third edition of the race, in February 2006, covered more than 700 km and started on the South Atlantic Ocean in a region first explored by Ferdinand Magellan. The route crossed the American continent all the way to the Pacific Ocean, where it led through the channels and the unexplored Peninsula Brunswick down to the Río San Pedro before ending in Punta Arenas. Team BUFF Spain won with a team that included German Ann Christine Meidinger, who went on to be the race's Global Marketing Director and co-founder of the Patagonian International Marathon. They completed the course in nine days, seven hours and 16 minutes, with Canadian Alberta Adventure Racing Team three hours behind in second and Feed the Machine from the US third. The other two entered teams failed to finish and Feed the Machine racer Bernice Pierson said: "I have raced Primal Quest twice as well as about 50 other races, but these last 50 hours of trekking have been the toughest that I have ever done. Ever!"

2005: The second Patagonian Expedition Race was 662 km long, beginning near the entrance to Torres del Paine National Park and ending at San Isidro Lighthouse on the shores of the Strait of Magellan. There was a strong mountain biking and kayaking bias and French Team La Clusaz Raid Aventure were the official winners; although Team Russia came in first but was disqualified after breaking the no-separation of team members rule in an initial kayaking leg. Both teams were taken on a rewarding trip to the scientific whale-watching base on Carlos III Island.

2004: The first ever race involved competitors from 10 different nations and was won by Xinix Water Purification, a team made up of three New Zealand racers and their American female captain Robyn Benincasa. The route was around 520 km long, with 212 km of mountain biking, 168 km of sea kayaking and 140 km of tough trekking and rope-work. It started in Punta Arenas and finished at the most southerly point ever reached in any expedition race at that time, in the town of Puerto Williams on Navarino Island.

== List of Winners ==
2012: AdidasTERREX/Prunesco (UK/New-Zealand/Spain): Nick Gracie, Sarah Fairmaid, Stuart Lynch, Albert Rocca

2011: AdidasTERREX/Prunesco (UK): Bruce Duncan, Fiona Spotswood, Nick Gracie, Mark Humphrey

2010: Helly Hansen-Prunesco (UK): Nicola Macleod, Andrew Wilson, Mark Humphrey, Bruce Duncan

2009: Helly Hansen-Prunesco (UK): Nicola Macleod, Andrew Wilson, Mark Humphrey, Bruce Duncan

2008: Authentic Nutrition (France / USA): Bruno Rey, Teresa Ellen Dewitt, Cyril Margaritis, Philippe Danneau

2007: TSL – La Clusas (France): Jerome Bernard, Cathy Ardito, Frédéric Charles, Laurent Ardito

2006 Winter: Nike-GNC (Chile): Victor González, Diego Banfi del Río

2006: Buff (Spain / Germany): Chemari Bustillo, Javier Rodriguez, Juanjo Alonso, Ann Christine Meidinger

2005: La Clusaz Raid Aventure (France): Laurent Ardito, Cathy Ardito, Frédéric Freddow, Jerome Bernard

2004: Xinix Water Purification (New Zealand / USA): Robyn Benincasa, Neil Jones, Christopher Morrissey, Jeff Mitchell

== Sponsors ==
Up till the 2011 race, the title sponsor of the race used to be Wenger, the manufacturer of the Genuine Swiss Army Knife as well as precision outdoor equipment and Swibo knives. The company signed up as title sponsor in 2009 on a three-year agreement. Peter Hug, Chief Executive Officer of Wenger, said, "The Patagonian Expedition Race is a unique human challenge, conducted in an environment where preparedness is everything and precision multi-discipline tools for the job are vital – exactly the principles on which our company was founded over 100 years ago."

The race is also supported by the Chilean Government, with the aim of promoting sustainable adventure travel in Chilean Patagonia. Many local businesses provide additional essential support for the logistics of the event.

== Olympic Partnership ==
The Patagonian Expedition Race entered an official partnership agreement with the Olympic Committee of Chile (Comité Olímpico de Chile, COCH) in October 2007. Although the event does not correspond to an Olympic discipline, the Committee recognizes the spirit and values of the event to be consistent with the core principles of the Olympics. The unique partnership makes this the only adventure race in the world that is recognized by a National Olympic Committee.
