= Ledlenser =

Business

Ledlenser GmbH & Co. KG
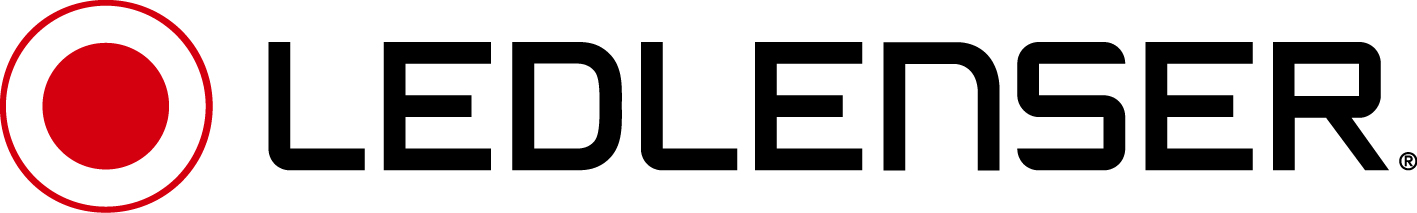
- Company type: GmbH & Co KG
- Industry: Technology
- Founded: 1993
- Founders: Rainer and Harald Opolka
- Headquarters: Solingen, Germany
- Key people: Thomas Willing (Managing Director)
- Products: Flashlights, Handlamps, Headlamps
- Net income: approx. 70M EUR (2017)
- Number of employees: approx. 900 (January 2019, group-wide)

Ledlenser GmbH & Co. KG is a German technology company that specialises in the manufacturing of portable lighting products (especially LED forehead and hand flashlights & inspection lamps). It is based in the North Rhine-Westphalian city of Solingen in Germany. It was founded by Rainer and Harold Opolka.

At the beginning of 2019, the company had around 115 employees in Germany and around 800 in the production plant in China. The company is headquartered with product development in Germany, and the company has a 100% owned manufacturing subsidiary in the People's Republic of China.

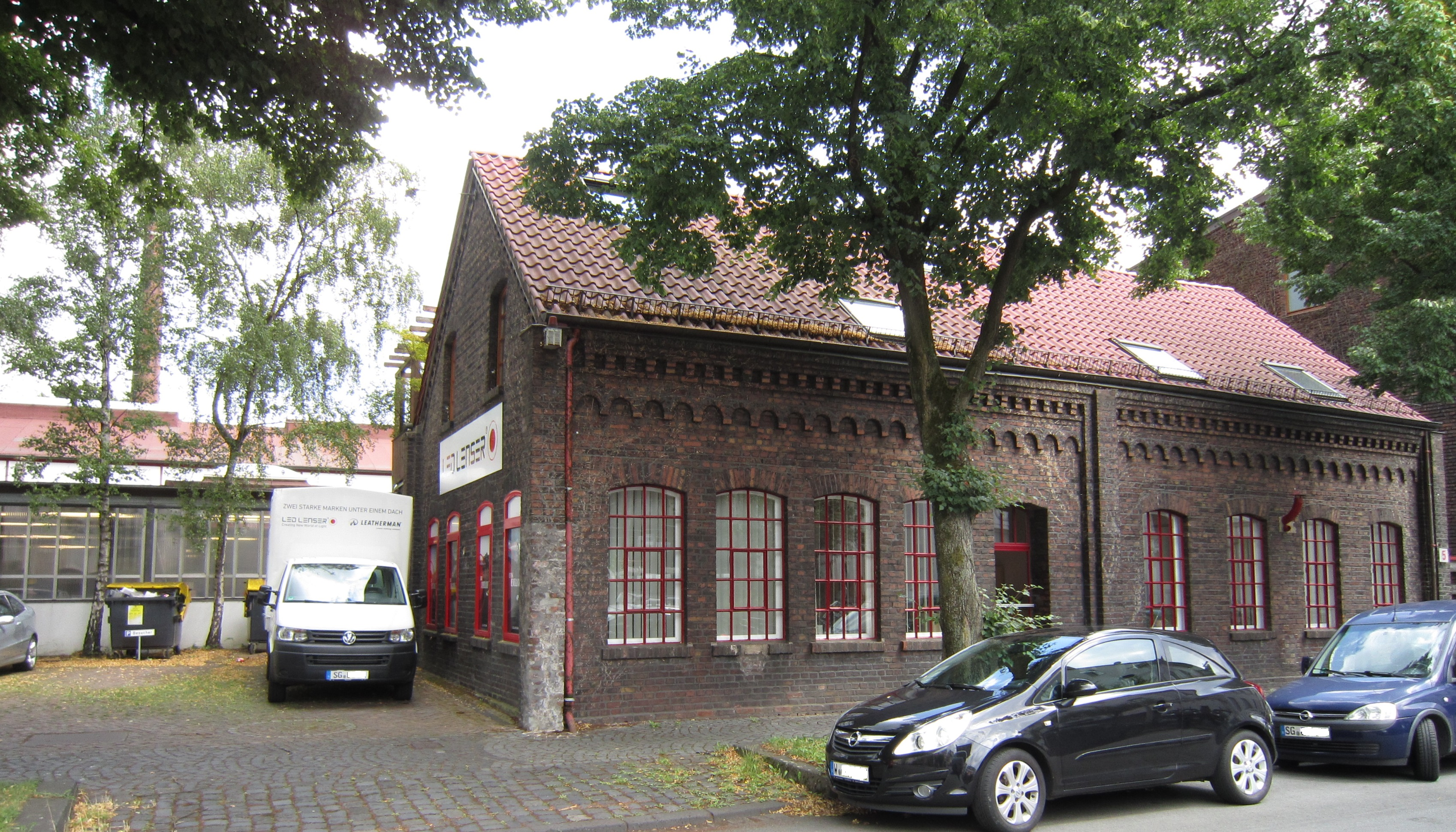
Ledlenser headquarters in Solingen-Ohligs

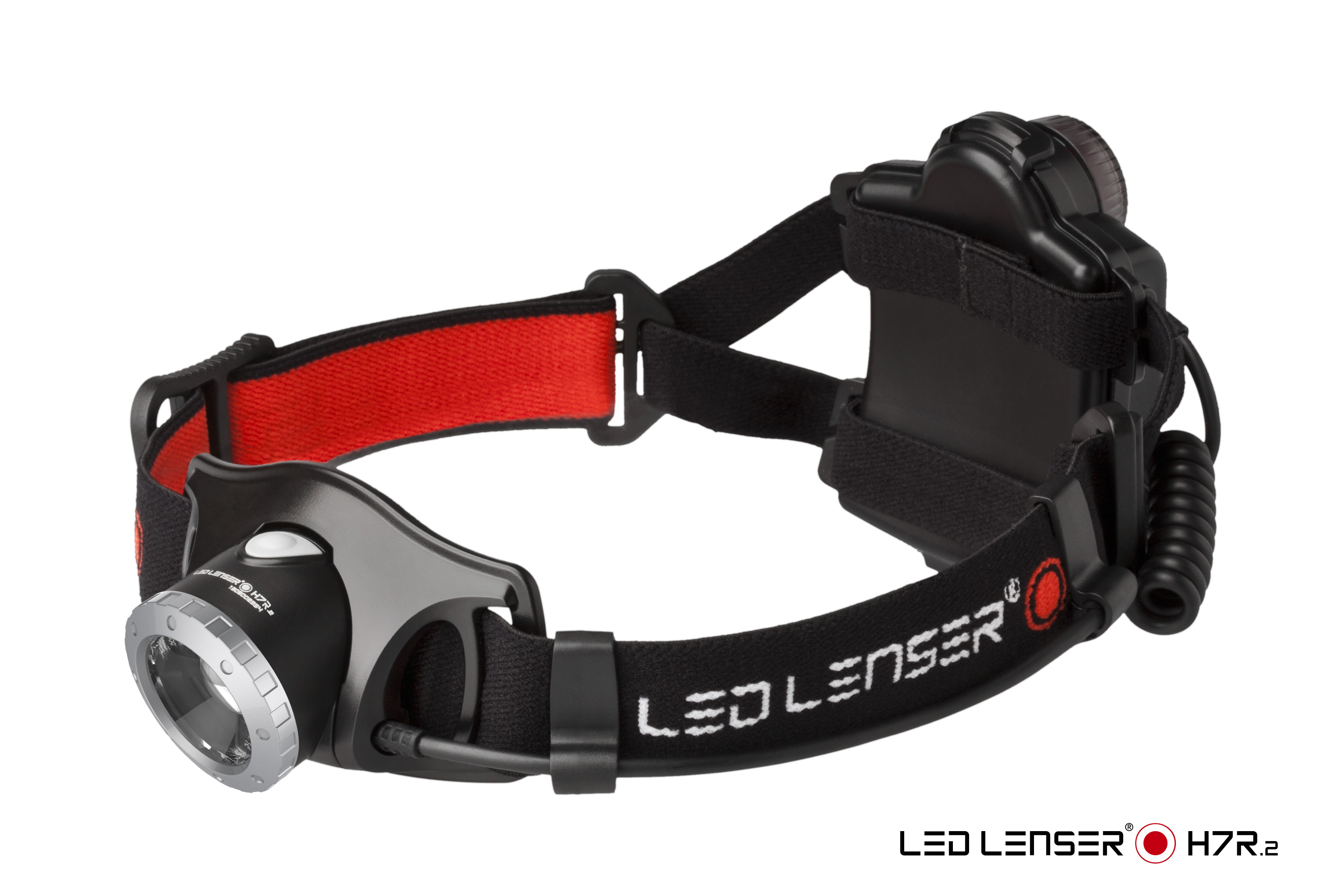
LedLenser's H7R.2 Headlamp

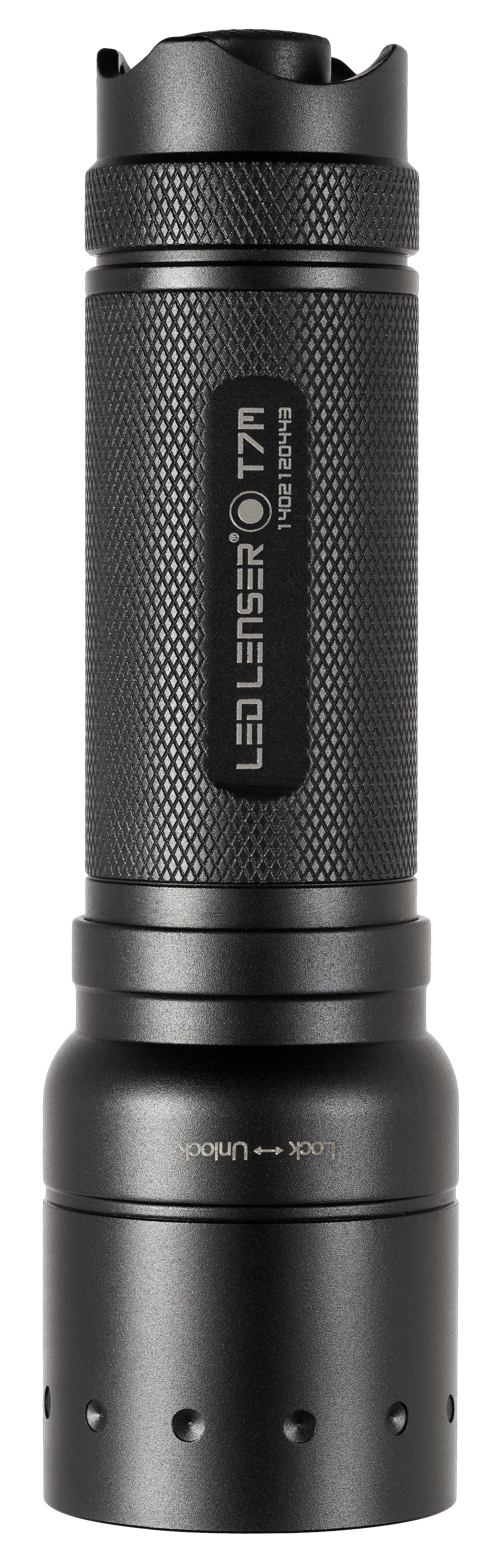
LedLenser's T7M Tactical Flashlight

== History ==
In 1993, twins Rainer and Harald Opolka founded a trading company for knives, scissors, and other steel goods under the name "Stahlwarenkontor GmbH" in Beelitz, southwest of Berlin. In 1997, the company relocated to Solingen under the name "Zweibrüder Stahlwarenkontor GmbH", where its headquarters remain today. The company's premises have been located in the Mathildenhütte, a renovated former glassblowing factory, since 2002. In 2002 the name was changed to Zweibrüder Optoelectronics GmbH.

In 2000, the Opolka twins built a 5 mm LED from Nichia into a housing. This resulted in the typical design for the following products with the perforated rim. The lamp, marketed under the name Photon Pump V8, went into stores in late 2000 and has sold over twelve million pieces in 80 countries around the world to date.

The products from the LedLenser series have received numerous design awards since 2001. Including the Red Dot design award, and the IF Design Award. In 2016, Ledlenser also received the German Brand Award in the category "Industry Excellence in Branding".

Ledlenser developed the Advanced Focus System for its flashlights (patented in the USA and Europe). The combination of lens and reflector creates a cone of light with every focus. Another innovation is the mechanical one-hand focusing on the basis of a sliding carriage. The Opolka twins have protected their own developments and products with over 100 patents, designs and utility models.

In January 2011 Leatherman Inc., Portland / Oregon (USA) took over the majority stake in Zweibrüder Optoelectronics GmbH, at the same time the company name changed to Zweibrüder Optoelectronics GmbH & Co. KG. Since 21 December 2017 the company name has been Ledlenser GmbH & Co. KG.Since then, the respective name Zweibrüder is not associated with Ledlenser anymore.

On 6 December 2018, the company was sold by Leatherman Tool Group Inc. to several shareholders, in particular AFINUM Achte Beteiligungsgesellschaft mbH & Co. KG, which holds the majority shares. Additionally, other shares are owned by INVISION and the Ledlenser management team.

Production is handled by the 100% subsidiary, Ledlenser Corporation Ltd. in Yangjiang, a district-free city on the Chinese south coast in the province of Guangdong. As of January 2019, around 800 employees worked there.

== Products ==
In addition to flashlights, headlamps, key lights and living room lights, the Ledlenser product range also includes explosion-proof lamps, diving lamps, and lamps that are tailored to the needs of fire brigade, rescue services, police and special units.

=== Flashlights ===
The Ledlenser program includes a variety of flashlights.

The products are divided into series, which differ in terms of design, different lumens and the technology used. For example, the P series models are operated without programming, the M series lamps (M = micro-controlled) are equipped with a microchip programming.

Ledlenser uses a proprietary measuring method for the runtime of the flashlights. The runtime specified by the manufacturer describes the duration the lamp takes for the brightness of the energy-saving level to drop to one lumen. For lamps without an energy-saving level (e.g. P3, P4, P5), the time is measured that elapses until the maximum brightness of the lamp has dropped to one lumen.

=== Headlamps ===
Ledlenser also develops headlamps for sport, outdoor use and professional use.

== Sponsorship ==
Ledlenser supports a so-called PRO team with national and international athletes in extreme and fun sports as brand ambassadors, including long-distance runner Jan Fitschen and extreme runner Christian Schiester.
