= Wenger =

Swiss Army knife manufacturer

Wenger SA
- Type: Société anonyme
- Predecessor: Paul Boéchat & Cie; Wenger & Co. S.A.
- Founded: 1893; 133 years ago
- Founder: Paul Boéchat
- Defunct: 2005
- Fate: Merged with Victorinox
- Headquarters: Delémont, Canton of Jura, Switzerland
- Products: Swiss Army knives, cutlery, watches, travel gear
- Number of employees: 150
- Parent: Victorinox AG
- Subsidiaries: SwissGear
- Website: www.wenger.ch

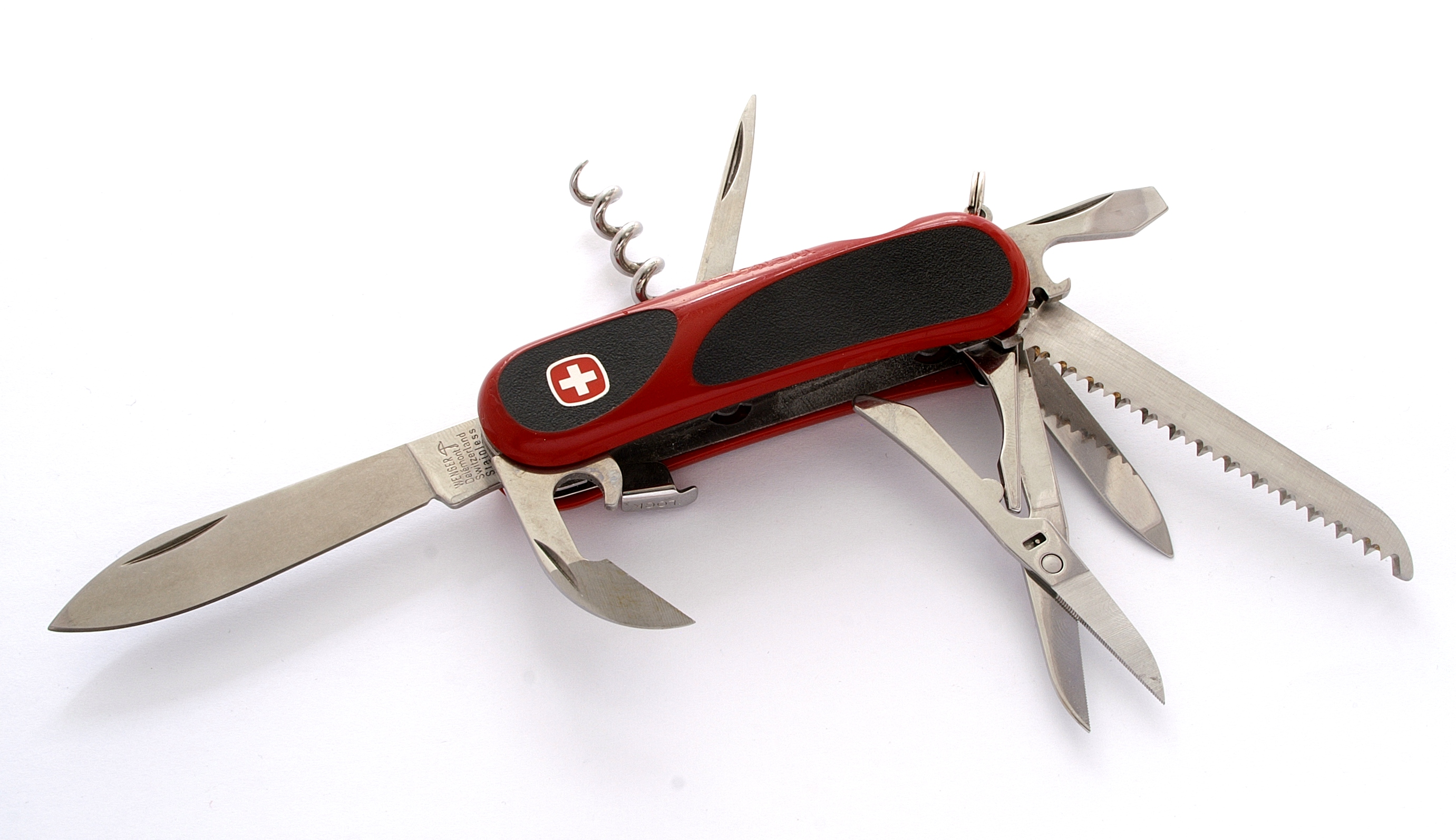
A Wenger Swiss Army knife

Wenger was a Swiss cutlery manufacturer that exists today as a brand of once-rival Victorinox, used for knives, watches and licensed products. Founded in 1893, it was best known as one of two companies to manufacture Swiss Army knives. Based in Delémont, Wenger was acquired in 2005 by Victorinox and partially absorbed. Since 2013 Wenger Swiss Army knives have been integrated in the Victorinox collection as the "Delémont collection".

== History ==
The history of Wenger S.A. is strongly linked to the history of the Swiss Army knife.

== Company origins ==
The industrial cutlery house of Paul Boechat & Cie (the future Wenger) was founded in 1893 at Courtételle in the Delémont valley in the Canton of Jura.

It received a contract from the Swiss Army to produce knives as the second industrial cutlery manufacturer of Switzerland.

In 1897 Theodore Wenger, a minister who had served in the US, was returning home to Switzerland and was hired by the group of entrepreneurs that had bought Boechat & Cie two years earlier (later renaming the company Wenger et Cie.).

One of Wenger's first acts was to acquire a manufacturer of spoons and forks which he moved to a rented factory in Delémont.

In 1900, a new 18,000-square-foot (1,700 m^{2}) facility was built. Both the utensil operations and the Courtételle cutlery production were incorporated into the new plant now called Fabrique Suisse de Coutellerie et Services.

In 1908 the Swiss Army decided to split the contract, with half of the order going to Victorinox, in the German-speaking canton of Schwyz, and the other half to Wenger in the French-speaking part of the canton of Bern.

In 1929, after Theo Wenger's death, Kaspar Oertli gained the majority share in the company.

=== Between 1929 and 2005 ===
In 1988, Wenger started producing watches, one year before Victorinox.

Wenger also had a subsidiary and brand named SwissGear, which produced luggage, backpacks, travel accessories, and watches.

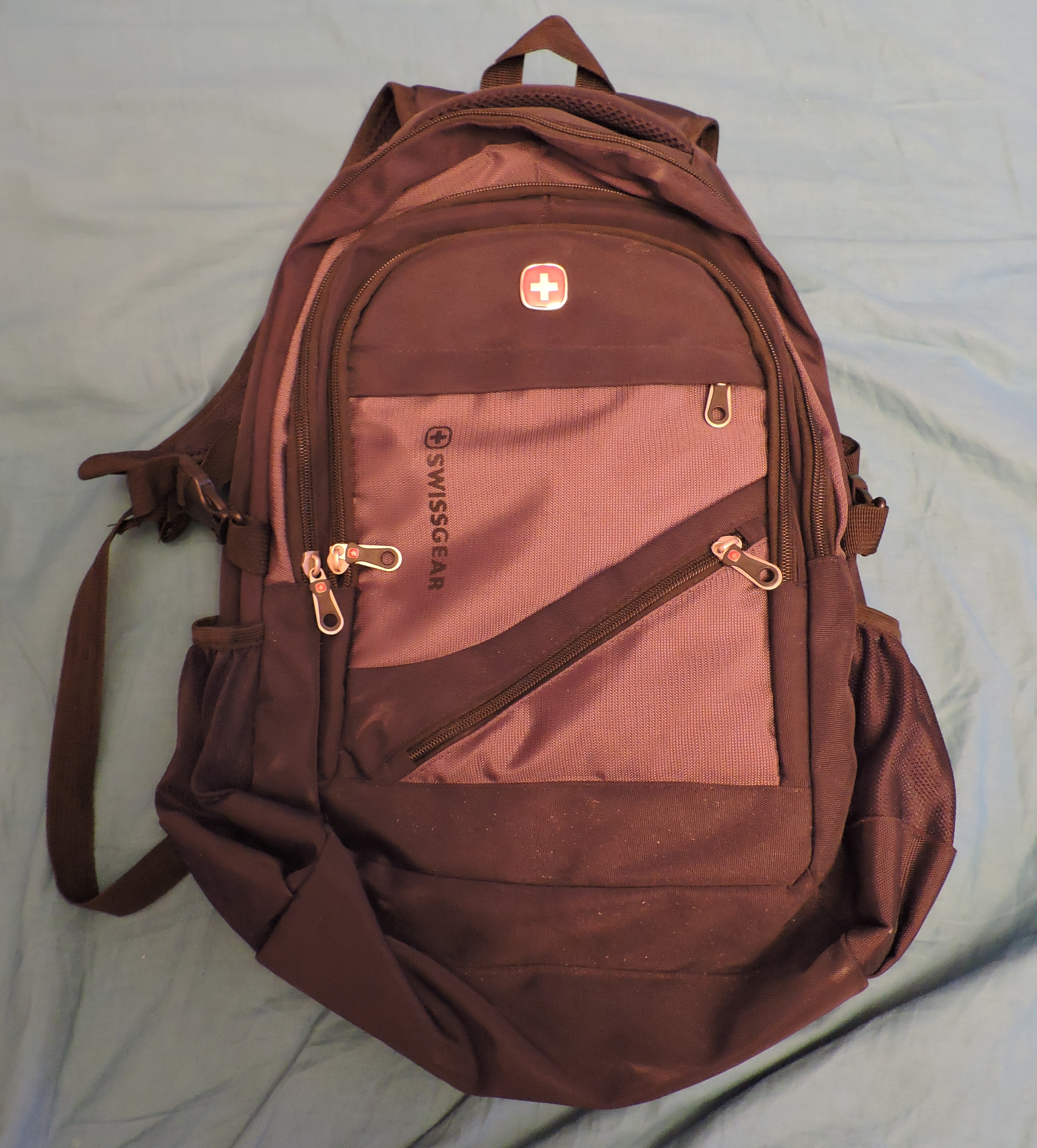
A SwissGear backpack

=== Crisis and restart ===
After the September 11 attacks all air traveling and related industries were facing a severe crisis. This was also the case for the Swiss Army knife manufacturers, and especially for Wenger S.A.

Changing airport security regulations which precluded the carrying of pocket knives diminished the sales of Swiss Army knives at duty-free shops. The crisis led to the acquisition of Wenger by its competitor Victorinox in 2005.

With the backing of Victorinox, Wenger was able for a time to maintain its own production and branding of Swiss army knives and watches. Wenger knives had been advertised as the "Genuine Swiss Army Knife" and Victorinox as the "Original Swiss Army Knife".

=== Rebranding after acquisition ===
After being acquired by Victorinox, in 2005 Wenger S.A. started to develop new products.

In the process of rebranding itself as a provider of multifunctional tools for outdoor adventures, Wenger started to cooperate with individuals such as Ueli Steck and Mike Horn acting as their brand ambassadors providing each of them with a suited multi-functional tool adapted to their specific challenges.

Additionally Wenger cooperated with Alinghi providing the sailors with a suited multifunctional tool. Most recently Wenger supports the Patagonia Expedition Race.

=== Product lines merging ===
On January 30, 2013, Wenger and Victorinox announced that the separate knife brands were going to be merged into one brand: Victorinox.

The press release stated that Wenger's factory in Delémont would continue to produce knives and all employees at this site will retain their jobs. They further elaborated that an assortment of items from the Wenger line-up will remain in production under the Victorinox brand name.

Wenger's U.S. headquarters will be merged with Victorinox's location in Monroe, Connecticut. Wenger's watch and licensing business will continue as a separate brand.

=== Recent developments ===
In March 2016, during the Baselworld 2016 expo, Victorinox relaunched the Wenger brand with marketing emphasising Swiss values at a reasonable price. Wenger changed its slogan to "A Swiss Company Since 1893" from "Maker of the genuine Swiss Army Knife", which was used for decades.

In 2017, Victorinox released a Swiss Army Knife model named "Wenger Red".

This knife has the Wenger logo and the Wenger brand name in the scale of the knife. This knife is delivered in a box with the Victorinox logo and brand name. This part number is produced in Delémont, Switzerland.

This is the only Swiss Army Knife with the Wenger logo and brand name that is being produced and sold as today.

== Products ==
The two main product lines of Wenger S.A. were the "Genuine Swiss Army Knife" and Wenger Watch.

Additionally Wenger S.A. makes kitchen cutlery under the brand names of Swibo, Grand Maitre.

=== Genuine Swiss Army Knife ===
Wenger produced pocket knives with body sizes ranging from about 65 mm to 130 mm (2.5" to 5") and blades of about 50 mm to 100 mm (2" to 4") in a red- or black-coloured case.

These knives often featured tools such as can openers and screwdrivers.

Since 2004, Wenger's "Evolution" series introduced ergonomic handles designed by Swiss designers Patrick Eppenberger and Paolo Fancelli, although the classic flat handles remained available.

Additionally, Wenger offered handles in various colors and materials, distinguishing itself from Victorinox by using a rectangular frame around the Swiss cross emblem (Victorinox uses a shield-shaped frame).

On Wenger knife blades, the brand name was accompanied by an embossed armbrust (crossbow), referencing Swiss national hero Wilhelm Tell.

Wenger produced numerous variants of Swiss Army knives, catering to diverse needs.

==== Basic models ====
These included only a blade and a multifunction tool that acted as a bottle opener, can opener, and screwdriver.

==== Specialized models ====
For specific groups like cyclists, golfers, or anglers, Wenger offered tailored knife designs.

==== Larger models ====
The Ranger, NewRanger, and RangerGrip lines, measuring 127 mm when closed, featured locking blades with a liner-lock system.

Certain models were designed for one-handed opening, which restricted their carry in Germany under § 42a of the German Weapons Act.

==== The Giant ====
The Swiss Army knife is famous for integrating different tools into one knife. Wenger created "The Giant," a knife featuring 87 tools and 141 functions, securing a Guinness World Record for the largest Swiss Army knife.

It measured 24 cm in width, weighed 1345 g, and was first introduced in 2007.

==== Heritage ====
Based on the original 1908 Swiss Army knife, Wenger introduced the limited-edition Heritage line.

=== Collaborated products ===
Wenger collaborated with individuals and organizations to create specialized knives:

==== Titanium Line ====
Designed for speed climber Ueli Steck, these knives met the demands of extreme mountaineering challenges.

==== Alinghi SUI 1 ====
Developed for the Swiss America's Cup sailing team Alinghi, these knives were tailored for sailors and used during the 32nd America's Cup in 2007.

==== Mike Horn Knife ====
Released in 2009, this knife supported adventurer and environmentalist Mike Horn's expeditions.

==== Patagonia Expedition Race Knife ====
Created for participants of the Wenger-sponsored Patagonia Expedition Race.

=== Wenger Cutlery Products ===
==== Kitchen knives ====
Wenger marketed kitchen knives under the "Grand Maître" brand ("Great Master") for private use and "SWIBO" for professional use, including butcher's knives with signature bright yellow handles. Later, other handle colors were introduced.

By maintaining a blend of innovation and tradition, Wenger solidified its place in the history of Swiss Army knives, offering both practical tools and collectible items.

=== Wenger Watches ===
Wenger Watches are made in Switzerland. The company's head office is located in Delémont Switzerland.

The watches are supposedly related to the basic ideas and concept of the Swiss Army Knife, having a multifunctional outdoor focus. Additionally Wenger produces several watches focusing only on elegance.

== Other products ==
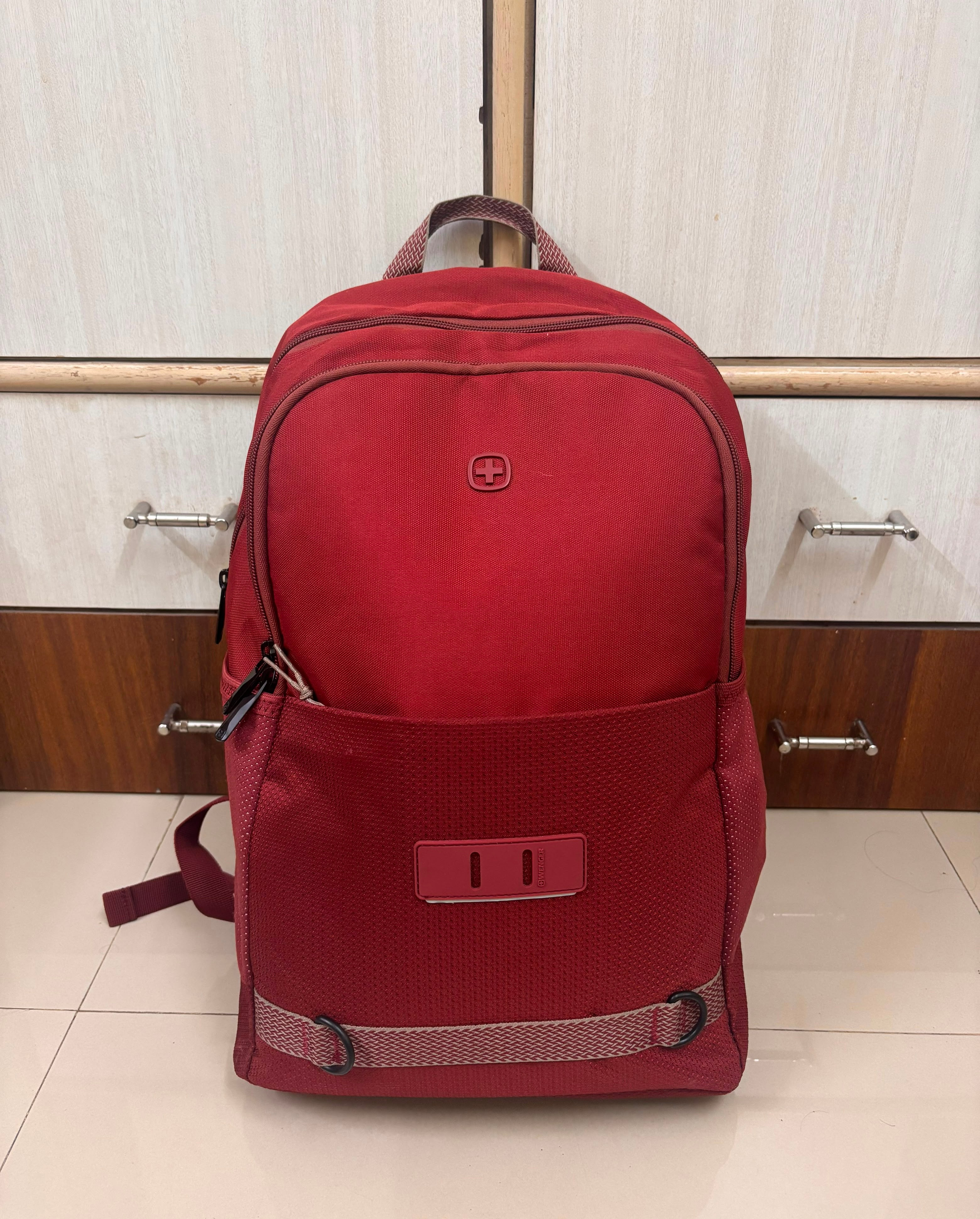
A red Wenger backpack

Wenger makes notepads that can function as a twofold wallet.

Wenger produced bayonets for the Swiss Stgw 90 assault rifle. The bayonet has an overall length of 310 mm and a muzzle ring diameter of 22 mm. The 177 mm long blade is single-edged and it has no fuller.

The bayonets were manufactured exclusively for the Swiss Army by Wenger and Victorinox (before the two companies merged).

In North America, licensed products using the Wenger and SwissGear trademarks are owned independently from Victorinox SA, and are used to

market camping equipment (particularly tents, backpacks and sleeping bags), luggage, backpacks and office/business needs.

== Gallery ==
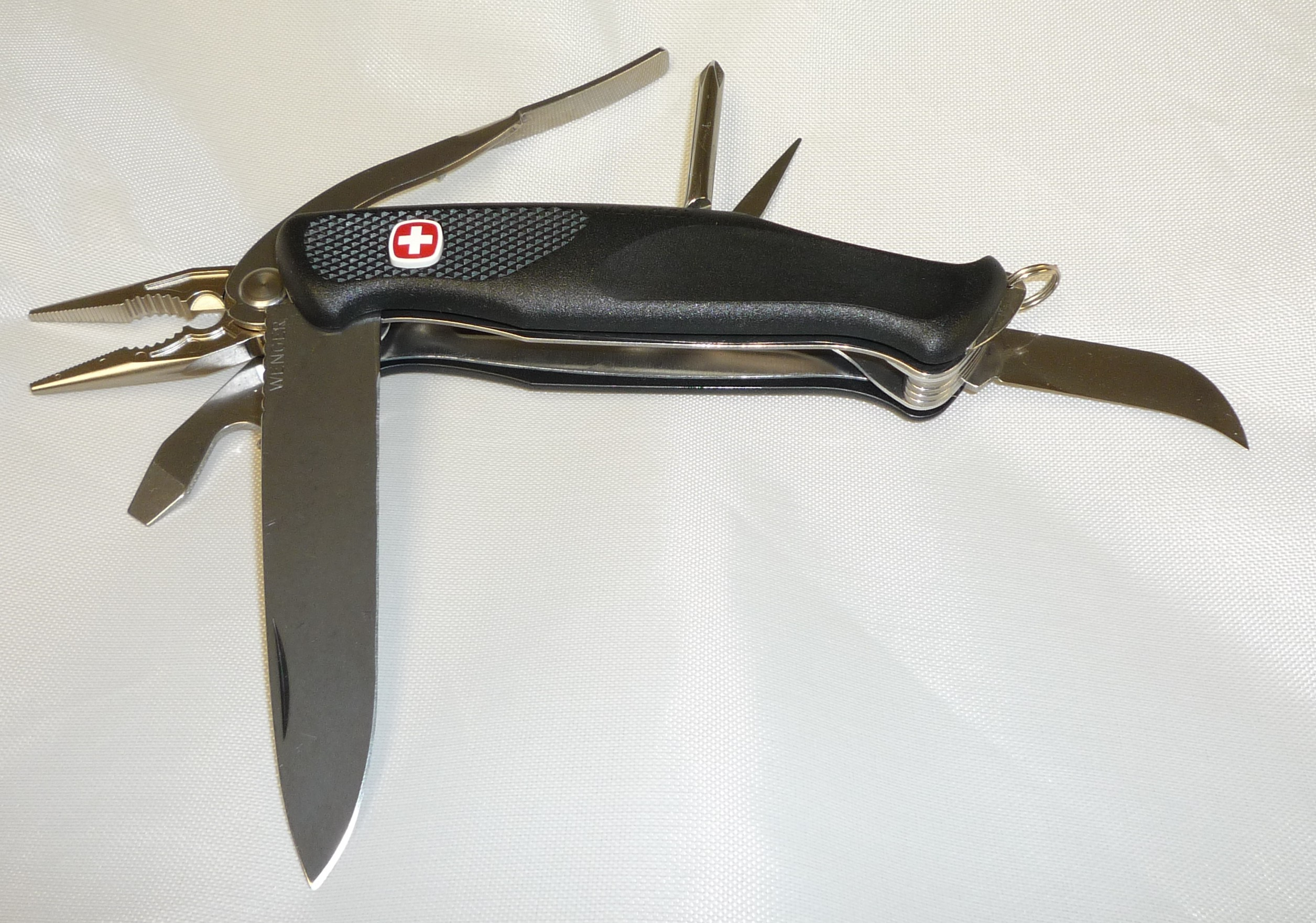
Ranger 73

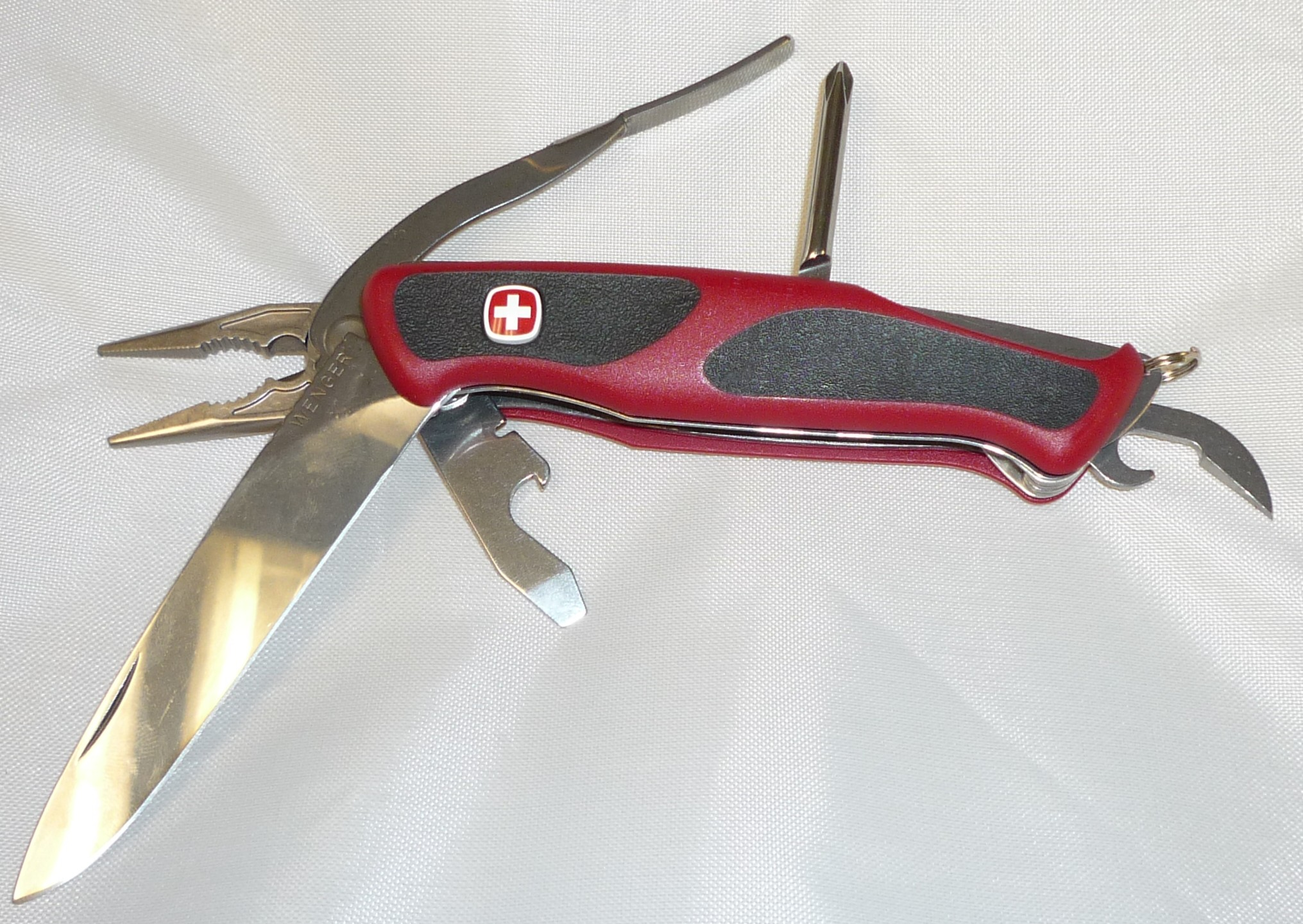
RangerGrip 75

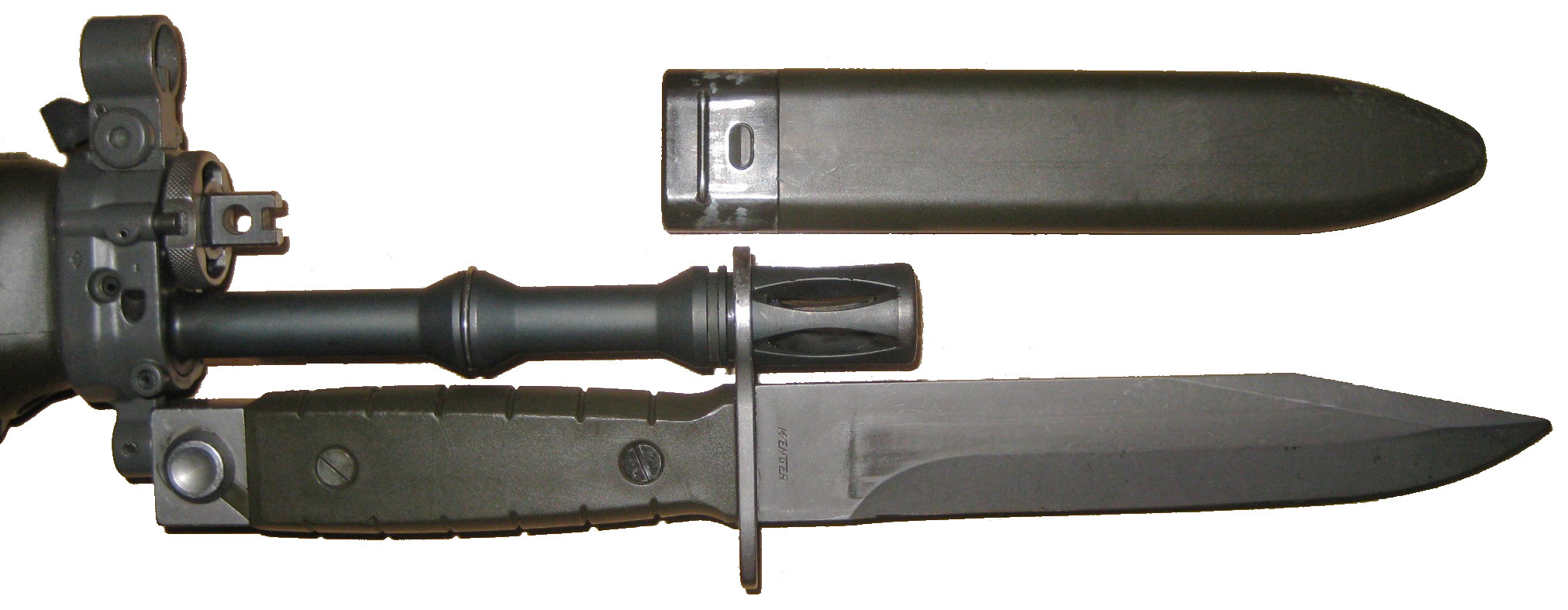
Stgw 90 bayonet

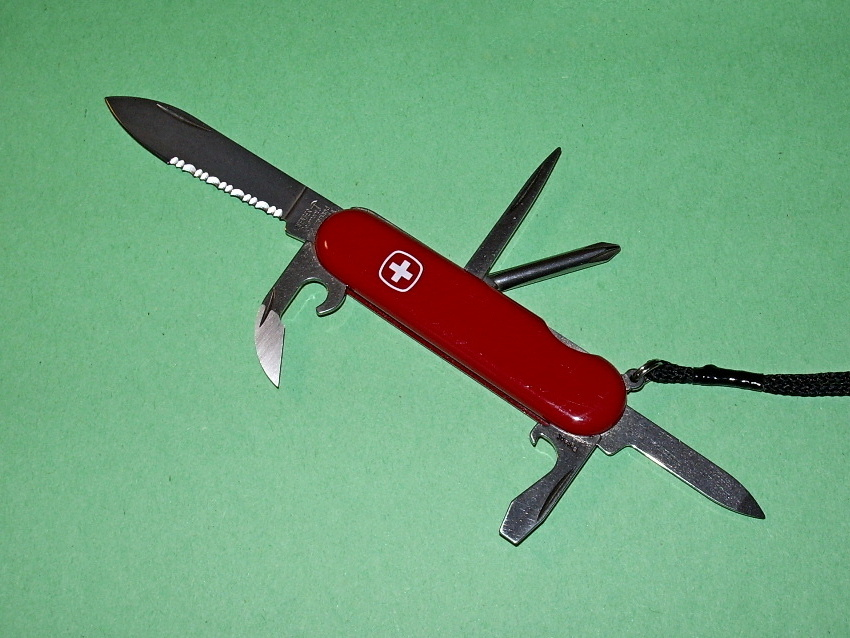
Wenger Highlander

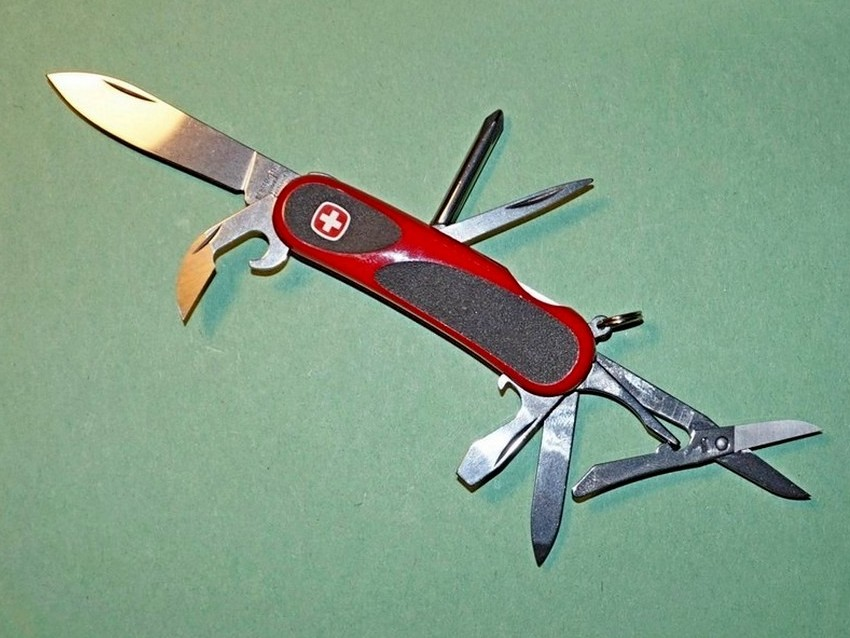
Wenger Evogrip 16

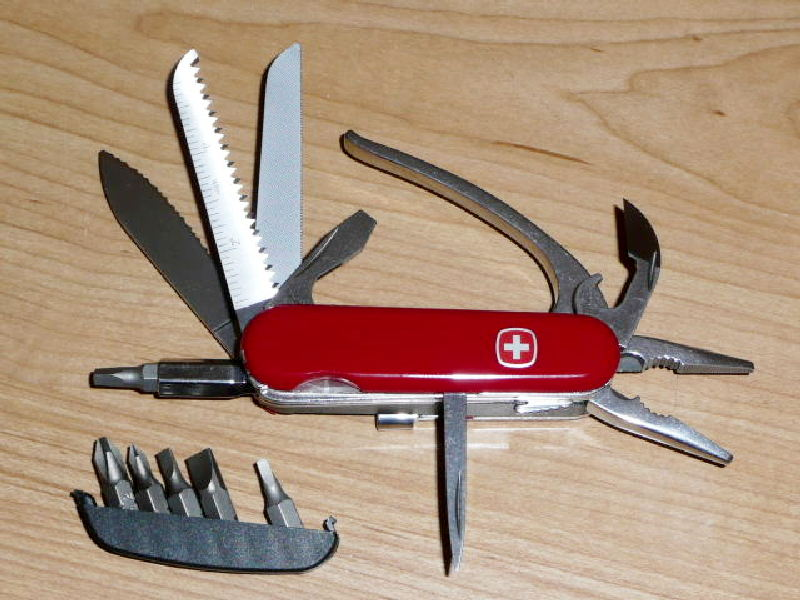
Wenger Pocketgrip

== See also ==
- Leatherman
- Gerber multitool
- Multi-tool
