= Leatherman =

American brand of multi-tool

Leatherman Tool Group, Inc.
- Type: Private
- Industry: Manufacturing
- Founded: July 1983; 43 years ago
- Headquarters: Portland, Oregon, United States
- Key people: Tim Leatherman (chairman of the board and co-founder); Steve Berliner (secretary/treasurer and co-founder); Kris Hamper (president/CEO)
- Products: Multi-tools; Folding knives
- Number of employees: Over 540
- Website: leatherman.com

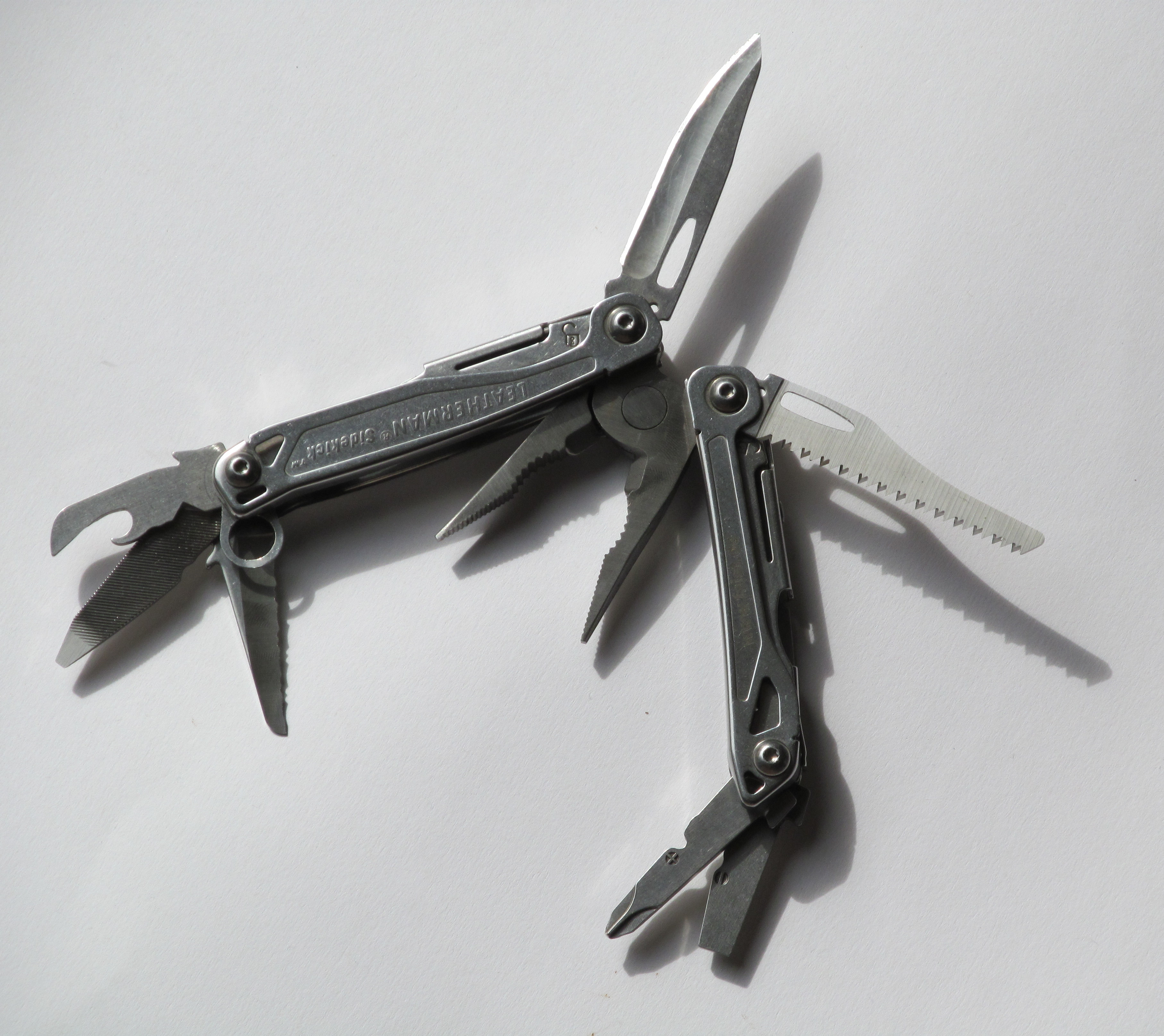
Leatherman Sidekick with all tools unfolded

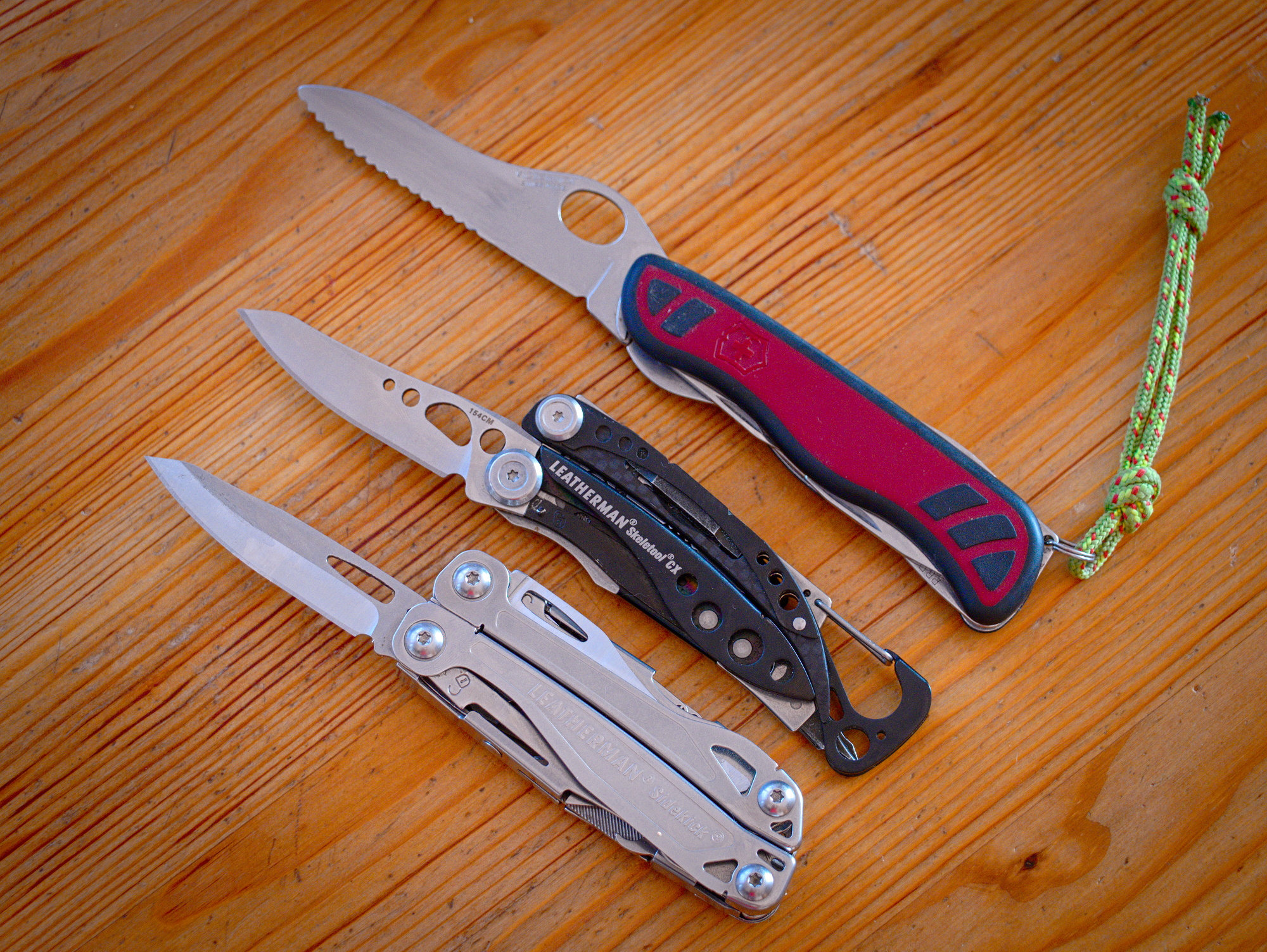
Leatherman Sidekick, Leatherman Skeletool CX and Victorinox Nomad One Hand (assisted-opening knife)

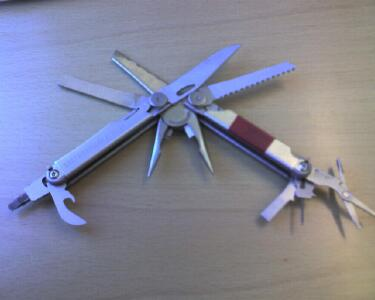
Leatherman Wave with all tools unfolded

Leatherman Surge

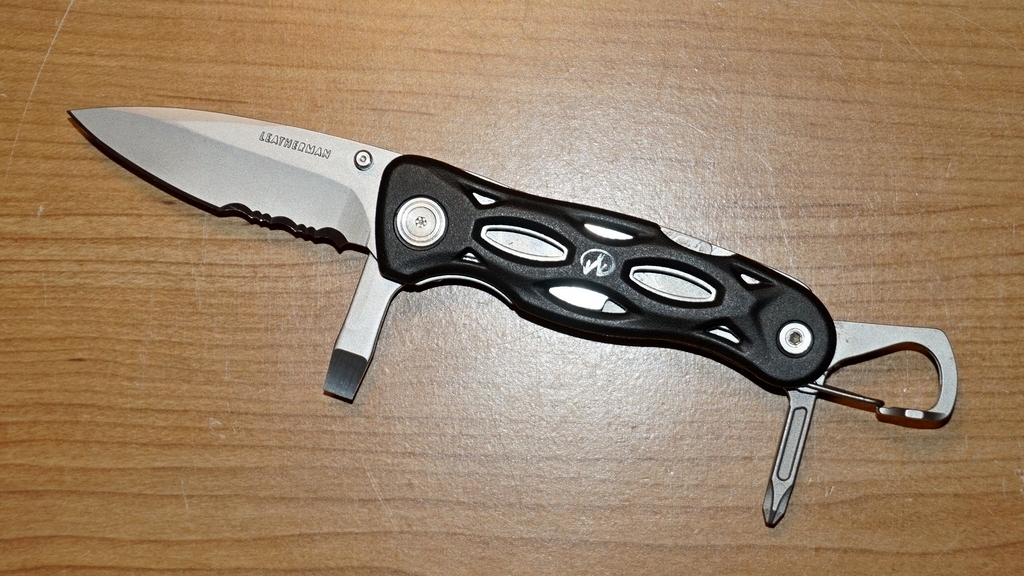
Leatherman e303

Leatherman is an American brand of multi-tool made by Leatherman Tool Group of Portland, Oregon. The company was founded in July 1983 by Timothy S. Leatherman and Steve Berliner in order to market the former's idea of a capable, easily portable hand tool with multiple functions. That same year, Leatherman Tool Group sold its first Multi-Tool, which was called the PST (Pocket Survival Tool).

== Company history ==
Timothy S. Leatherman, a 1970 mechanical engineering graduate of Oregon State University, and his business partner, Steve Berliner, formed Leatherman Tool Group in 1983.

Leatherman was inspired to design a "Boy Scout knife with pliers" while he and his wife traveled Europe and the Middle East in 1975, often attempting to use a simple pocketknife to repair both their aged and repeatedly malfunctioning Italian Fiat 600 car (bought in Amsterdam for $300) and leaky hotel plumbing. He spent several years perfecting the "Mr. Crunch" prototype and received his first U.S. patent (4,238,862) in 1980. After additional refinement, Leatherman's first product was introduced in 1983 as the Pocket Survival Tool (PST) and initially sold through Early Winters' and Cabela's mail-order catalogs.

Leatherman sold nearly 30,000 tools in 1984, fueling additional product development, and rapid growth both in the company and manufacturing capacity. By the end of 2001, the company had sales of $100 million annually and had sold more than 20 million tools.

Folding knives were introduced into the Leatherman product line in 2005. In 2007, the company opened its first retail store, located at its manufacturing facility, which has since relocated to a retail store at the Cascade Station shopping center near the facility and Cascades MAX Station in Northeast Portland, Oregon. The same year, Tim Leatherman was inducted into the Blade magazine Cutlery Hall of Fame in recognition of his design impact on the cutlery history.

In 2011, the Leatherman Tool Group acquired German light manufacturer, Ledlenser. The brands and companies were run separately, under the Leatherman Tool Group, Inc. umbrella. Leatherman Tool Group also manufactures a line of multi-tools designed specifically for military and law enforcement personnel, as well as accessories for carrying and expanding the function of its tools. As of February 2011, Leatherman produced 50 products sold in 82 countries, with U.S. market share estimated at 55 percent.

Leatherman has a sponsorship deal with the Major League Soccer team Portland Timbers. Specifically, the company is the shirt sponsor for the team's mascot, "Timber Joey".

== Products ==
Leatherman's primary products are multi-tools and knives. Most Leatherman multi-tools are built around a pair of pliers, with up to 21 additional tools stored in the handles, including knives (straight and serrated blades), screwdrivers (flat, Phillips), saws, wire cutters and strippers, electrical crimper, bottle opener, and can opener. Most models have a built-in safety mechanism that locks the active tool in the open position when fully unfolded. Models range in weight from the 0.81 ounce (23 g) Style to the 12.5 ounce (335 g) Surge.

Leatherman currently produces folding knives under the Crater name. Models range from two tools (knife blade and carabiner/bottle opener) to four (blade, carabiner/bottle opener, flat, and Phillips screwdrivers).

Name	Type	Debut	Retired	# Tools
Arc	Full-sized	2023	—	20
Blast	Full-sized	2004	2012	16
Bolster - Costco Exclusive	Full-sized	2021	—	13
Bond	Full-sized	2021	—	14
Charge Ti	Full-sized	2004	2008	17
Charge XTi	Full-sized	2004	2008	16
Charge XTi 30th Anniversary Limited Edition	Full-sized	2013	2013	16
Charge AL	Full-sized	2007	2018	17
Charge ALX	Full-sized	2007	2018	18
Charge TTi	Full-sized	2007	2018	19
Charge TTi (Year-of-Monkey Limited Edition)	Full-sized	2016	2016	19
Charge+	Full-sized	2018	—	19
Charge+ G10 Special Edition (Red / Orange / Earth)	Full-sized	2018	—	19
Charge+ Limited Edition Forest Camo	Full-sized	2018	retired	19
Charge+ Limited Edition Woodland Camo	Full-sized	2018	retired	19
Charge+ TTi	Full-sized	2018	—	19
Charge+ TTi Damascus Limited Edition	Full-sized	2018	2018	19
Charge+ Damascus Carbon Fibre Limited Edition	Full-sized	2018	2018	19
Charge+ Damascus Wood Limited Edition	Full-sized	2018	2018	19
Charge+ 35th Anniversary Limited Edition	Full-sized	2018	2018	19
Charge+ Tom Sachs NASA-themed Limited Edition	Full-sized	2021	2021	23
Core	Full-sized	2005	2009	19
Crunch	Heavy-Duty	1999	2023	15
Curl	Full-sized	2021	—	15
Darkside - Leatherman Garage Batch 002 Limited Edition	Full-sized	2022	2022	21
Flair	Full-sized	1999	2004	16
Free K2	Pocketknife	2019	—	8
Free K2X	Pocketknife	2019	—	8
Free K4	Pocketknife	2019	—	9
Free K4X	Pocketknife	2019	—	9
Free T2	Pocket	2019	—	8
Free T4	Pocket	2019	2025	12
Free P2	Full-sized	2019	2025	19
Free P4	Full-sized	2019	2025	21
Fuse	Full-sized	2004	2012	13
Freestyle	Pocket	2009	retired	5
Freestyle CX	Pocket	2009	2012	5
Juice KF4	Pocket	2001	2005	16
Juice C2	Pocket	2001	2006	12
Juice S2	Pocket	2001	2006	12
Juice CS4	Pocket	2001	2006	15
Juice XE6	Pocket	2001	2006	18
Juice Pro Ltd Ed Costco	Pocket	2002	2003	23
Juice SC2	Pocket	2003	2005	12
Juice SX – Original	Pocket	2013	2014	11
Juice SX – New	Pocket	2014	2019	11
Kick	Full-sized	2004	2012	12
Leap	Pocket	2014	2014	13
Micra	Keychain	1996	—	10
Micra 30th Anniversary Limited Edition	Keychain	2013	2013	10
Micra 35th Anniversary Limited Edition	Keychain	2018	2018	10
Mini Tool	Pocket	1986	2004	10
Mr. Crunch Limited Edition	Full-sized	2022	2022	21
MUT (Military Utility Tool)	Heavy Duty / Firearms	2010	—	16
MUT EOD (Military Utility Tool Explosive Ordnance Disposal)	Heavy Duty / Firearms	2010	2021	15
OHT (One-Handed Tool)	Heavy-Duty	2012	2022	16
PST (Pocket Survival Tool)	Full-sized	1983	2004	14
PST II (Pocket Survival Tool II)	Full-sized	1996	2004	15
The Collector's Edition PST (Pocket Survival Tool) 35th Anniversary Limited Edition	Full-sized	2018	2018	14
Pulse	Full-sized	2000	2004	15
Raptor Rescue	EMS Duty	2013	—	6
Raptor Rescue Glow-in-the-Dark Limited Edition (Purple / Gold)	EMS Duty	?	retired	6
Raptor Response	EMS Duty	2021	—	4
Rebar	Full-sized	2012	—	17
Rev	Full-sized	2015	—	14
Sideclip	Full-sized	1998	2004	12
Sidekick	Full-sized	2011	—	14
Signal	Heavy-Duty / Camping	2015	—	19
Signal TOPO Limited Edition	Heavy-Duty / Camping	?	—	19
Signal Black & Silver Limited Edition	Heavy-Duty / Camping	?	—	19
Skeletool	Pocket	2007	—	7
Skeletool CX	Pocket	2007	—	7
Skeletool KB	Pocketknife	2017	—	2
Skeletool KBx	Pocketknife	2017	—	2
Skeletool RX	Pocket	2016	—	7
Skeletool SX	Pocket	2013	retired	7
Skeletool Damasteel Limited Edition	Pocket	?	retired	7
Skeletool TOPO Limited Edition	Pocket	?	—	7
Skeletool Black & Silver Limited Edition	Pocket	?	—	7
Squirt E4	Keychain	2003	2010	10
Squirt ES4	Keychain	2010	2021	9
Squirt P4	Keychain	2002	2010	10
Squirt PS4	Keychain	2010	—	9
Squirt S4	Keychain	2002	2010	10
Style	Keychain	2010	2014	5
Style CS	Keychain	2010	2021	6
Style PS	Keychain	2012	—	8
Super Tool	Heavy-Duty	1994	2001	18
Super Tool 200	Heavy-Duty	2001	2005	18
Super Tool 300	Heavy-Duty	2009	—	19
Super Tool 300 EOD (Explosive Ordnance Disposal)	Heavy Duty / Firearm	2010	—	19
Super Tool 300 30th Anniversary Limited Edition	Heavy-Duty	2013	2013	19
Super Tool 300M	Heavy Duty / Firearm	?	—	18
Surge – Original	Heavy-Duty	2005	2013	21
Surge – New	Heavy-Duty	2013	—	21
Surge New Black & Silver Limited Edition	Heavy-Duty	?	—	21
Tread	Wearable	2015	2021	29
Tread Metric	Wearable	2015	2021	29
Tread LT	Wearable	2015	2021	29
Tread Tempo	Wearable	?	retired	?
Tread Tempo Black & Silver Limited Edition	Wearable	?	retired	?
Tread Tempo LT	Wearable	?	retired	?
Tread Tempo LT Black & Silver Limited Edition	Wearable	?	retired	?
Tread QM1	Wearable	TBD	—	—
Wave – Original	Full-sized	1998	2004	16
Wave – New	Full-sized	2004	2018	17
Wave - 20th Anniversary Limited Edition	Full-sized	2003	2003	17
Wave - 25th Anniversary Limited Edition	Full-sized	2008	2008	17
Wave – Damascus Ltd Ed	Full-sized	2009	2009	17
Wave+	Full-sized	2018	—	18
Wave+ Black & Silver Limited Edition	Full-sized	?	—	18
Wave+ The Houston Home Inspector Limited Edition	Full-sized	?	retired	18
Wave+ 35th Anniversary Limited Edition	Full-sized	2018	2018	18
Wingman	Full-sized	2011	—	14
Wingman Black & Silver Limited Edition	Full-sized	?	retired	14
Genus	Heavy-Duty / Gardening	2007	2009	9
Vista	Full-sized / Gardening	2006	2009	9
Hybrid	Full-sized / Gardening	2006	2009	11
Z-Rex	Full-sized	2012	2019	4

== Gallery ==
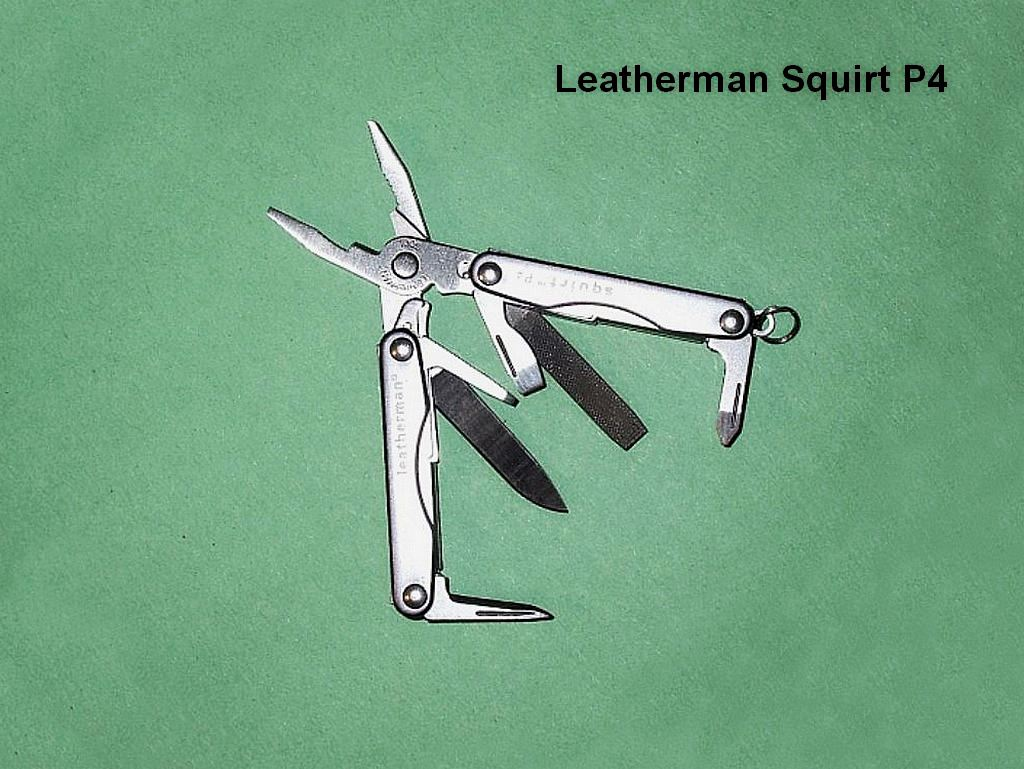
Leatherman Squirt P4

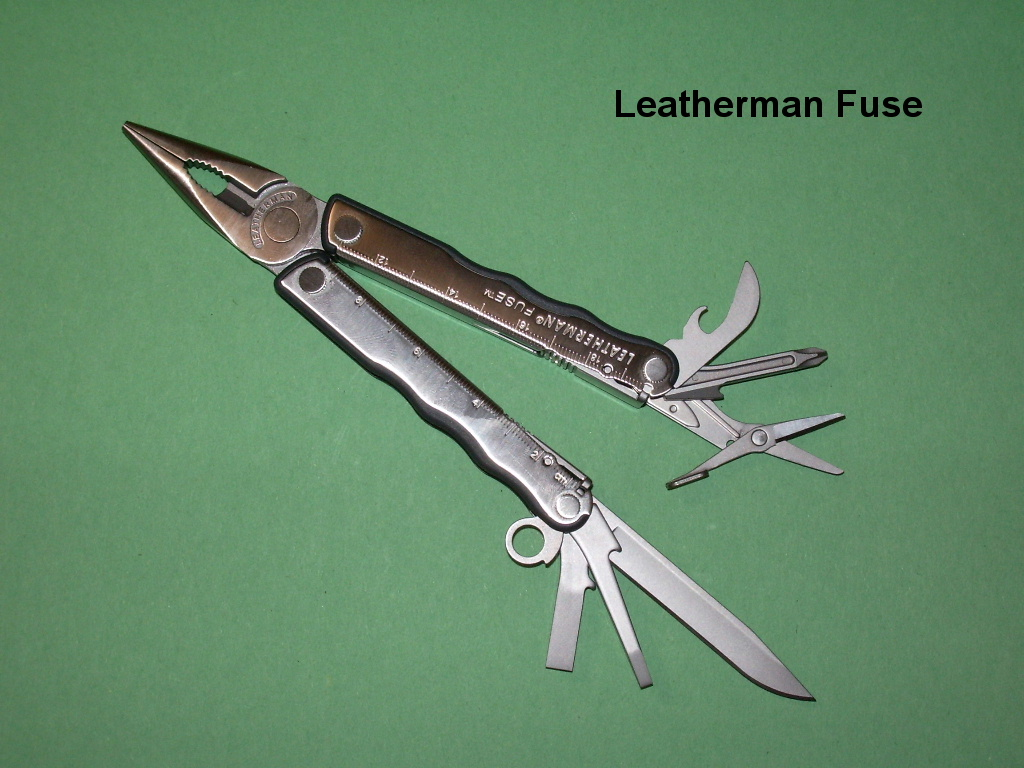
Leatherman Fuse

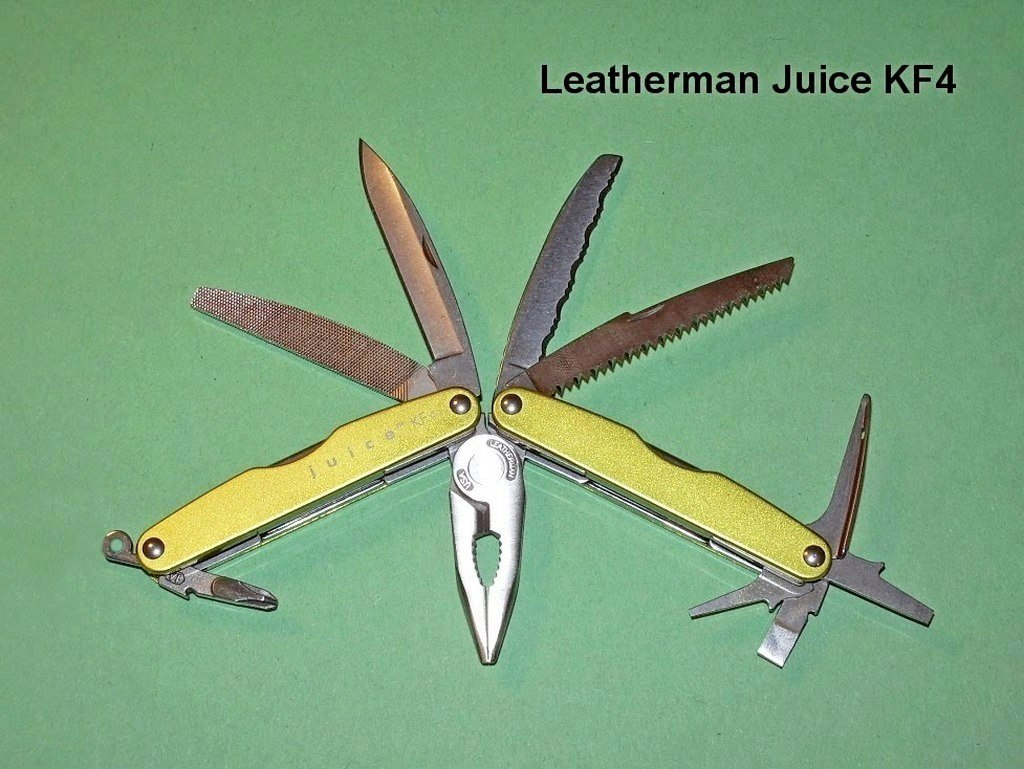
Leatherman Juice KF4

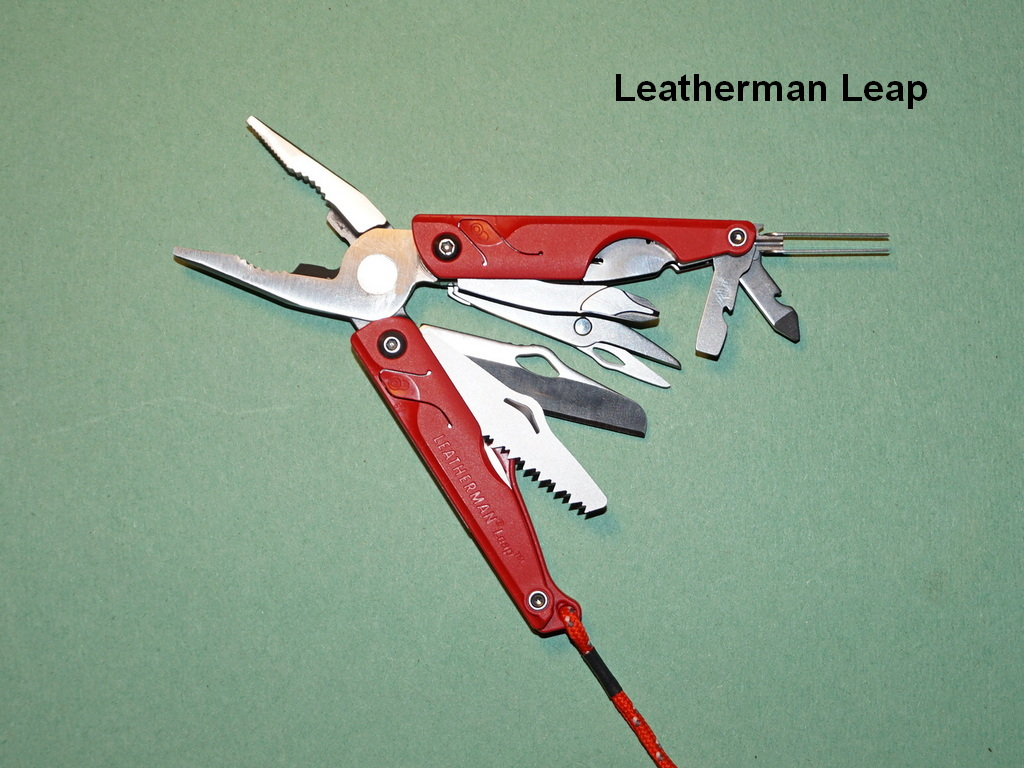
Leatherman Leap

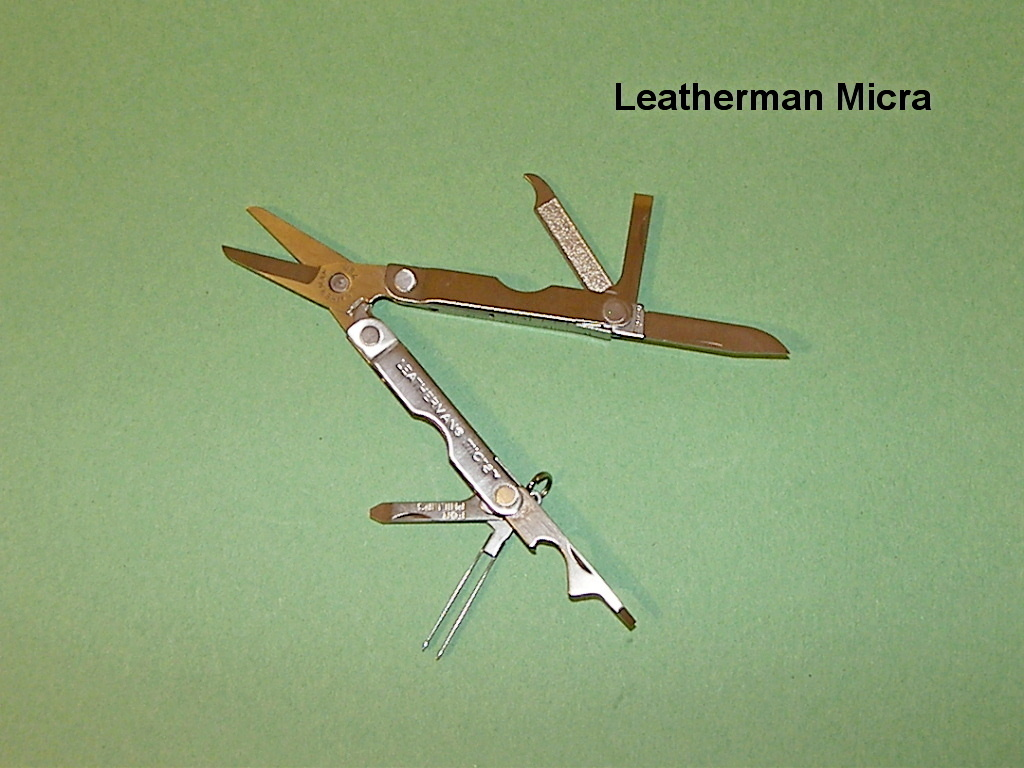
Leatherman Micra

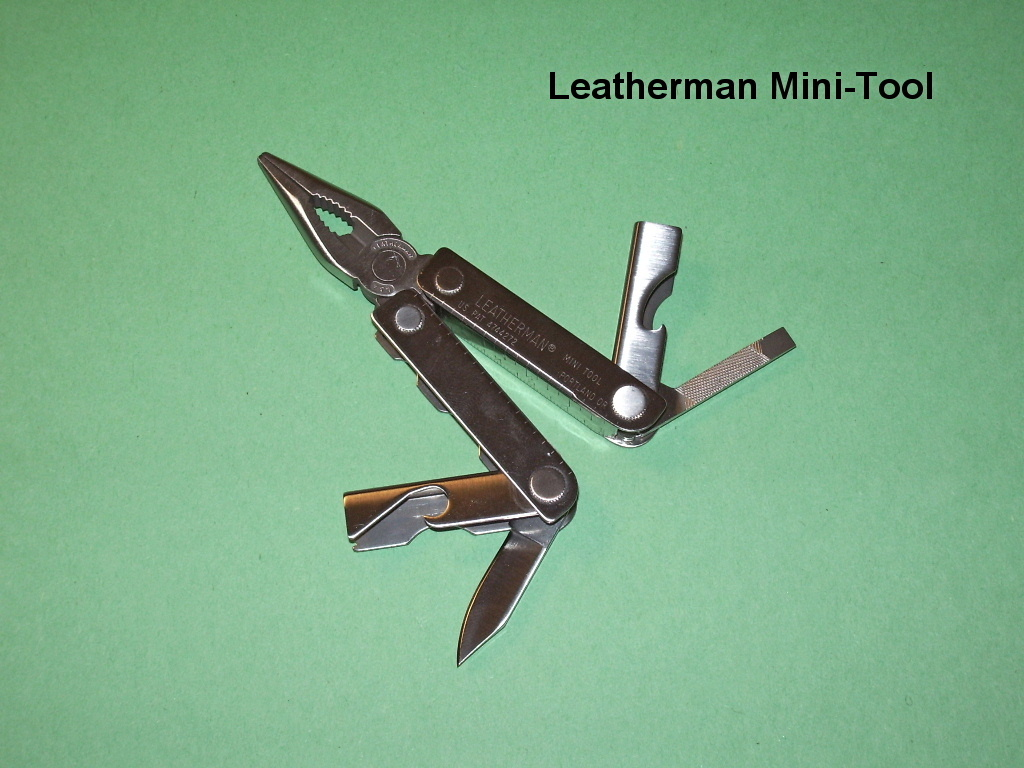
Leatherman Mini-Tool

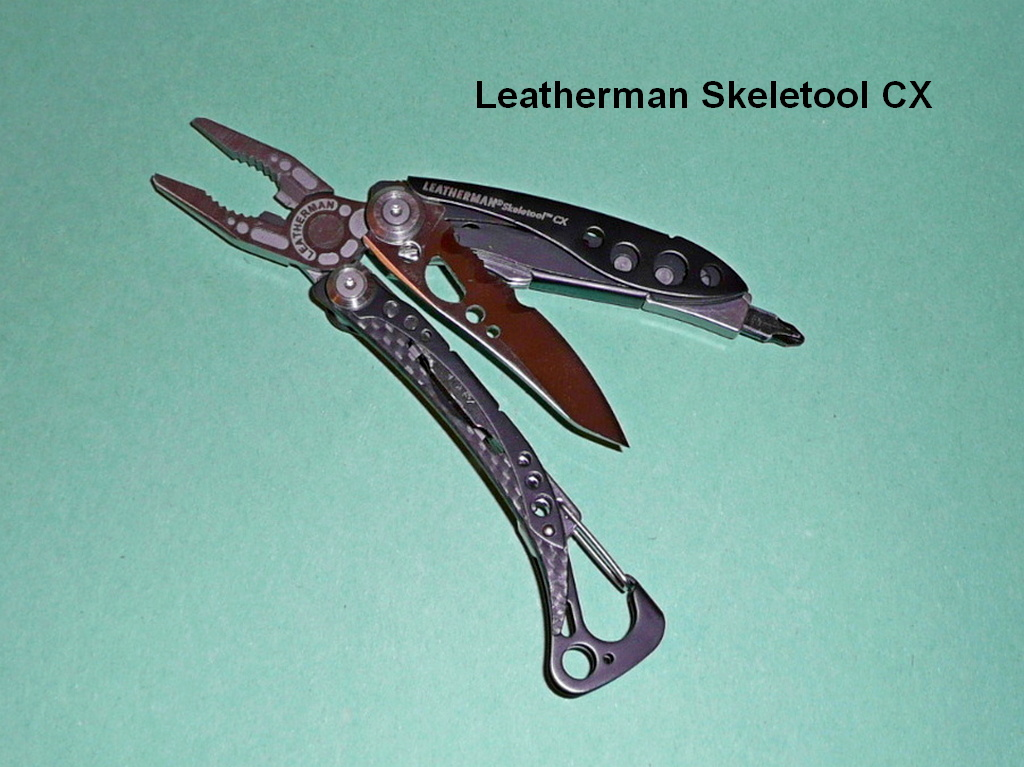
Leatherman Skeletool CX

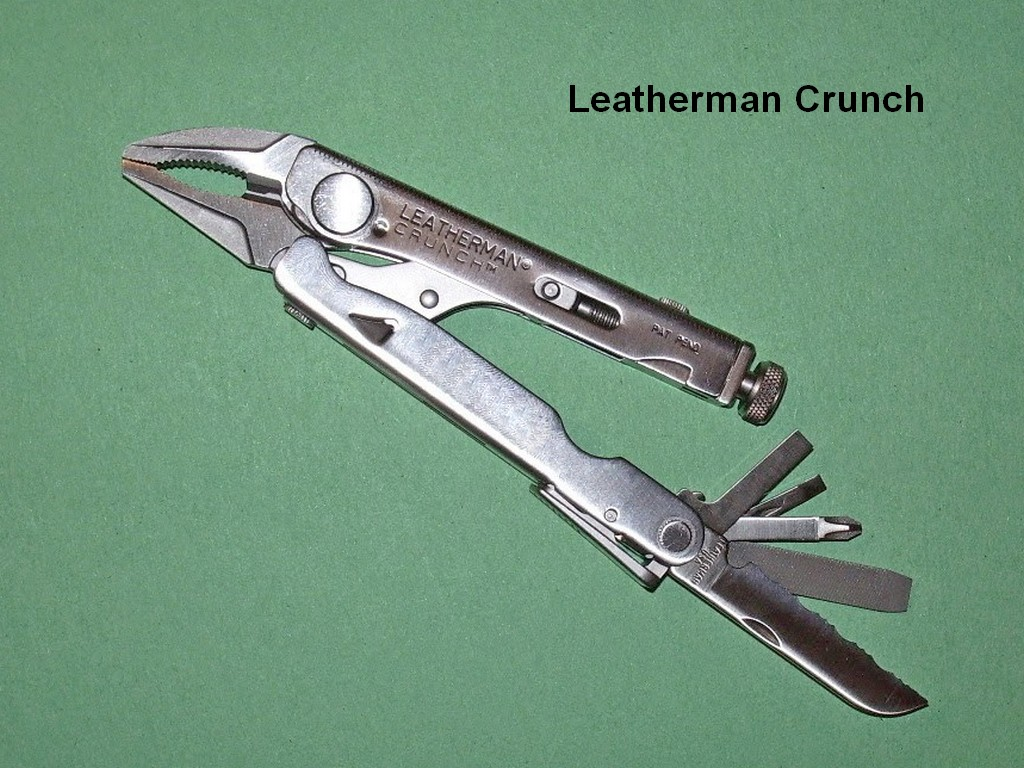
Leatherman Crunch

== See also ==
- Gerber multitool
- Swiss Army knife
- Victorinox
- Wenger
