= Personal injury lawyer =

Lawyer with a special focus

A personal injury lawyer is a lawyer who provides legal services to those who claim to have been injured, physically or psychologically, as a result of the negligence of another person, company, government agency or any entity. Personal injury lawyers primarily practice in the area of law known as tort law. Examples of common personal injury claims include injuries from slip and fall accidents, traffic collisions, defective products, workplace injuries and professional malpractice.

The term "trial lawyers" is used to refer to personal injury lawyers, even though many other types of lawyers, including defense lawyers and criminal prosecutors also appear in trials and even though most personal injury claims are settled without going to trial.

== Qualification ==
A personal injury lawyer must qualify to practice law in the jurisdiction in which the lawyer practices. In many states, they must also pass a written ethics examination.

Lawyers may take continuing legal education (CLE) classes in order to learn about developments in the law or to learn about new practice areas. In states that require lawyers to attend CLE, personal injury lawyers may take CLE courses relevant to personal injury law, but are not required to do so.

=== United States ===
Certain bar associations and attorney organizations offer certifications, including certification of lawyers in the field of personal injury. Certification is not required to practice personal injury law, but may help a lawyer demonstrate knowledge in the field to potential clients. Within the U.S., not all state bars offer certification for personal injury law. Some states, such as New Jersey, allow lawyers to become Certified Trial Attorneys, a credential that is available to both plaintiff and defense attorneys. Some states, such as Arizona, restrict the use of the words "specialist" or "specialize" to lawyers who have obtained a certification from the State Bar Board of Legal Specialization in a specific field of law, with one such certification being in the area of personal injury law. In Texas, the Texas Board of Legal Specialization (TBLS) offers board certification in Personal Injury Trial Law to attorneys who meet rigorous requirements related to trial experience, peer review, and continuing legal education. Attorneys who obtain this certification may publicly identify as specialists in the field.

== Practice ==
Lawyers may concentrate their practice to specific areas of law, including personal injury law. Some lawyers may further specialize to a specific area of personal injury, such as medical malpractice law. By limiting the range of cases they handle, personal injury lawyers are able to acquire specialized knowledge and experience.

=== Client relations ===
Before accepting a new case, a personal injury lawyer typically interviews a prospective client and evaluates the client's case to determine the basic facts and potential legal claims that might be made, identifies possible defendants, and evaluates the strength of the case. A lawyer may decline to accept a case if the lawyer believes that the legal claims will not succeed in court or if the cost of litigation is expected to exceed the amount that can reasonably be recovered from the defendants as compensation for the client's injury.

=== Compensation ===
Lawyer fees may be charged in a number of ways, including contingency fees, hourly rates, and flat fees. In many countries, personal injury lawyers work primarily on a contingency fee basis, sometimes called an if-come fee, through which the lawyer receives a percentage of a client's recovery as a fee, but does not recover a fee if the claim is not successful.

In some jurisdictions, or by virtue of the retainer agreement between an attorney and client, the amount of the legal fee may vary depending upon whether a case settles before a lawsuit is filed, after a lawsuit is filed but before trial, or if the case goes to trial. For example, a retainer agreement might provide that a lawyer will receive a 33 and 1/3% contingency fee if a case settles before a lawsuit is filed, a 40% contingency fee if the case settles after the lawsuit is filed, or up to 45% if the lawsuit goes to trial.

Due to the high cost of litigation, personal injury lawyers are rarely retained to work based on an hourly fee. However, defense attorneys who are hired to contest personal injury claims are often paid on an hourly basis.

=== Ethics ===
An attorney should provide diligent representation to clients, and the ultimate professional responsibility of a personal injury lawyer is to help plaintiffs obtain just compensation for their losses. As with all lawyers, the attorney-client relationship is governed by rules of ethics.

In the United States, lawyers are regulated by codes of conduct established by state bar associations, which have the power to take disciplinary action against lawyers who violate professional or ethical regulations. States normally require all contingency agreements between lawyers and their clients to be in writing, and may limit the amount that may be charged as a contingency fee to a specific maximum percentage of the recovery.

=== Marketing ===
The market for personal injury firms is highly competitive in the U.S., and some firms maintain large marketing budgets to attract potential clients. Marketing efforts include advertising on television, radio, the Internet and social media, billboards, and in print publications. In some jurisdictions, lawyer marketing has moved away from the historic expectation of decorum in lawyer advertising. An industry has arisen for law firms that do little legal practice, instead focusing on client generation and referral of cases to other law firms.

== Organizations ==
Although membership is not required for personal injury practice, many personal injury lawyers join professional associations. For example:

- American Bar Association – a professional association dedicated to improving the legal system and providing accreditation for law schools and continuing legal education programs
- Association of Personal Injury Lawyers – an association based in Nottingham, England; founded in 1990 by personal injury lawyers on behalf of accident victims
- Consumer Attorneys Association of Los Angeles – CAALA is one of the largest associations of plaintiffs' lawyers in the United States and hosts one of the largest annual attorneys' conventions.
- American Association for Justice – an association of trial lawyers that was founded in 1946 by a group of plaintiffs' attorneys committed to safeguarding victims' rights. Prior to 2007, this organization was called the Association of Trial Lawyers of America, or ATLA.
- The National Trial Lawyers – a national organization composed of trial lawyers, offering networking opportunities, advocacy training and educational programs for trial lawyers.
- Personal Injuries Bar Association (PIBA) - a specialist bar association for UK barristers who practise in the field of personal injuries.

== Criticism ==
Critics of personal injury lawyers claim that litigation increases the cost of products and services and the cost of doing business. For example, critics of medical malpractice lawyers argue that lawsuits increase the cost of healthcare, and that lawsuits may inspire doctors to leave medical practice or create doctor shortages. These concerns, often raised in response to efforts to reform healthcare, have not been well substantiated. A publication by the Robert Wood Johnson Foundation found little evidence that traditional tort reforms affect medical liability costs or defensive medicine. A study conducted on a bipartisan basis in Texas has found that tort reform, once enacted, had no impact on reducing the cost of medical care, tending to throw doubt on claims made by tort reform advocates.

== See also ==
- Ambulance chasing
- Big Apple Pothole and Sidewalk Protection Committee
- Compensation culture
