= Sidewalk =

Pedestrian path along the side of a road

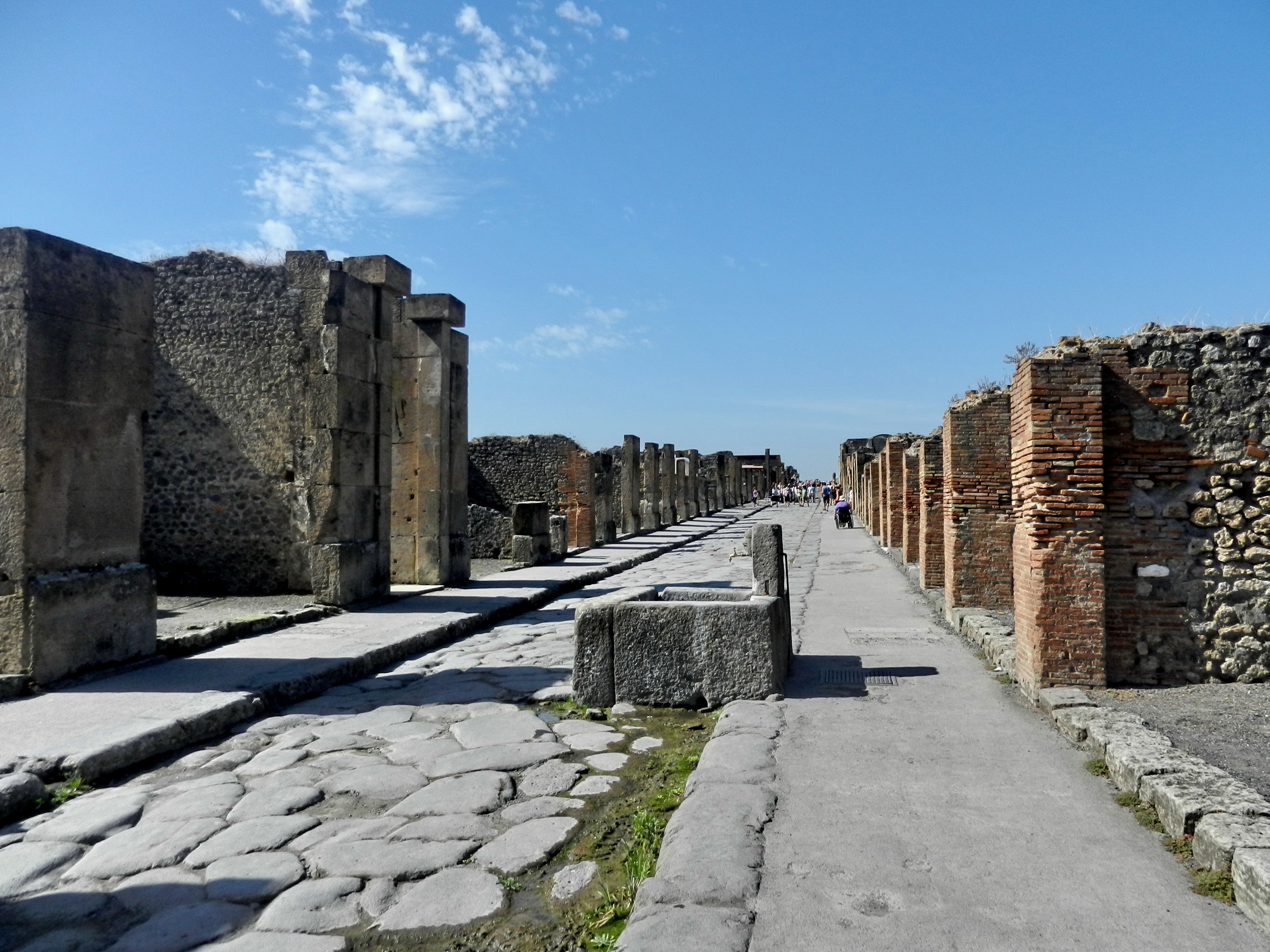
Raised sidewalk with stone curbs beside a 2000-year-old paved road in Pompeii, Italy

A sidewalk (North American English), pavement (British and South African English) or footpath (Australian, Indian, Irish and New Zealand English) is a footpath along the side of a road or street, designed primarily for pedestrians and low-speed personal transporters such as mobility scooters and postal NEVs. Sidewalks are usually paved by concrete, pavers, bricks, tiles, stones or asphalt (as opposed to unpaved trails), and are normally slightly elevated from the roadway and separated from motor vehicle lanes by a curb or gutter. There may also be a planted strip between the sidewalk and the roadway and between the roadway and the adjacent buildings, land lots and private properties.

== Terminology ==
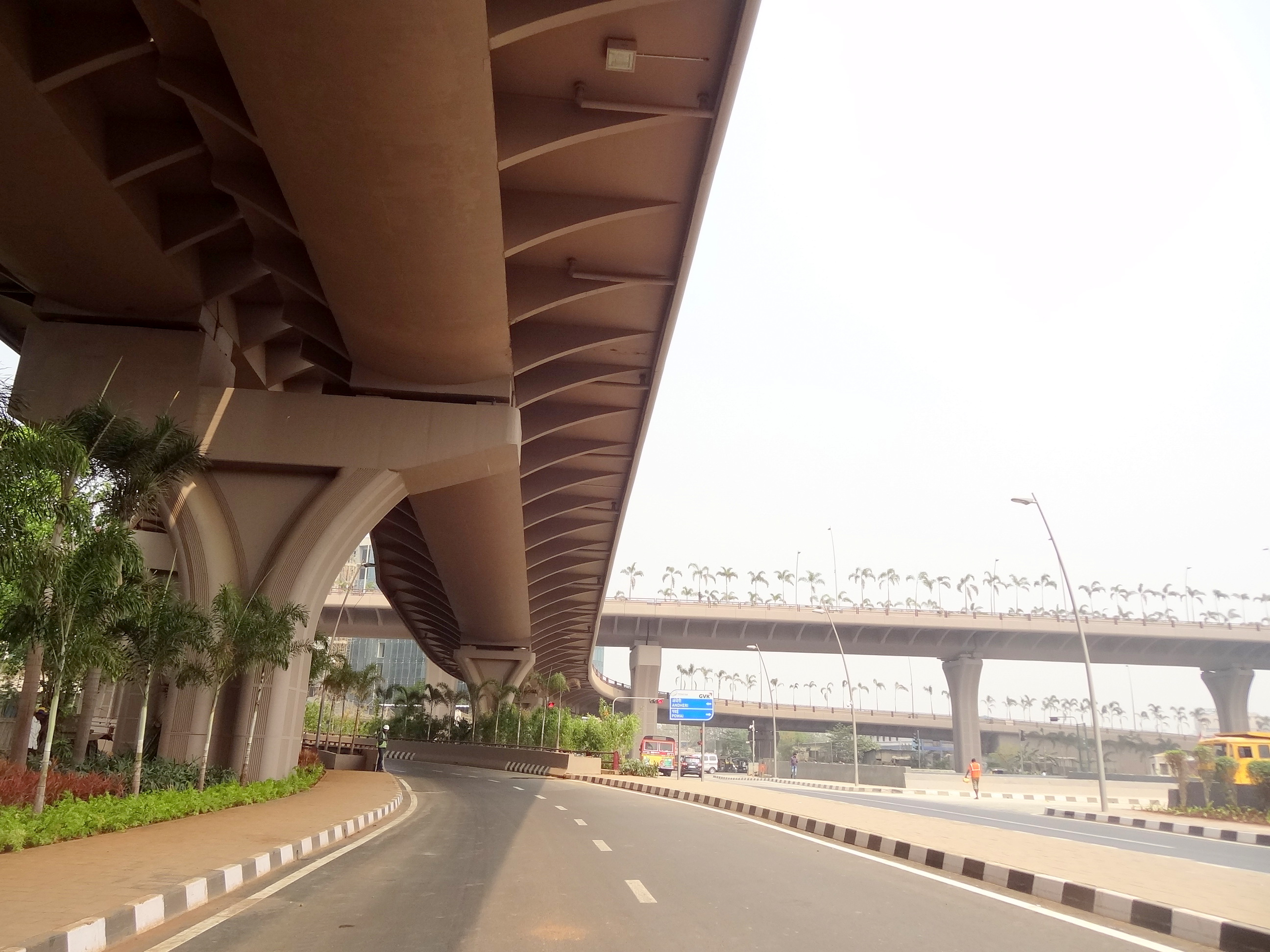
Pavements and planted strips in India (Mumbai/Bombay)

The preferred term for a pedestrian path beside a road varies based on region.

The term "sidewalk" is preferred in most of the United States and Canada. The term "pavement" is more common in the United Kingdom and some other members of the Commonwealth of Nations, as well as parts of the Mid-Atlantic United States such as Philadelphia and parts of New Jersey. Australia, New Zealand, and many other Commonwealth countries use the term "footpath".

In the United States, the term sidewalk is used for the pedestrian path beside a road. "Shared use paths" or "multi-use paths" are available for use by both pedestrians and bicyclists. "Walkway" is a more comprehensive term that includes stairs, ramps, passageways, and related structures that facilitate the use of a path as well as the sidewalk.

In the United Kingdom, the term "footpath" is mostly used for paths that do not abut a roadway. The term "shared-use path" is used where cyclists are also able to use the same section of path as pedestrians.

In Australia and New Zealand, the term 'footpath' is used for all pedestrian paths, whether or not it runs alongside the road. A 'shared path' (or 'shared-use path') is a 'paved area particularly designed...for the movement of cyclists and pedestrians', and 'pavement' is the 'portion of a road designed for the support of...vehicular traffic'.

== History ==
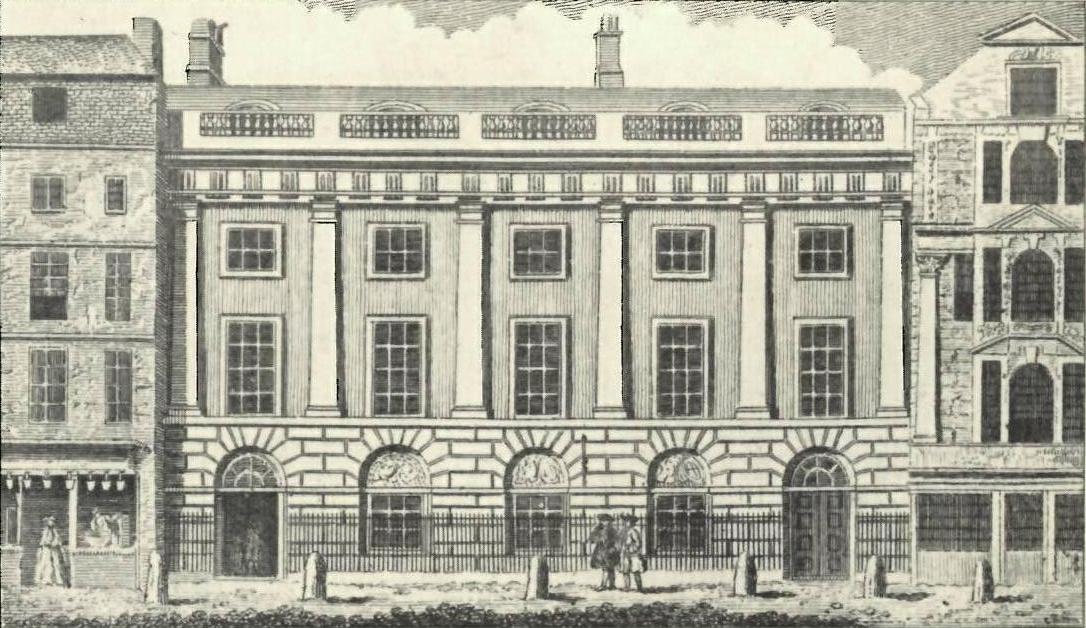
East India House, Leadenhall Street, London, 1766. The pavement is separated from the main street by six bollards in front of the building.

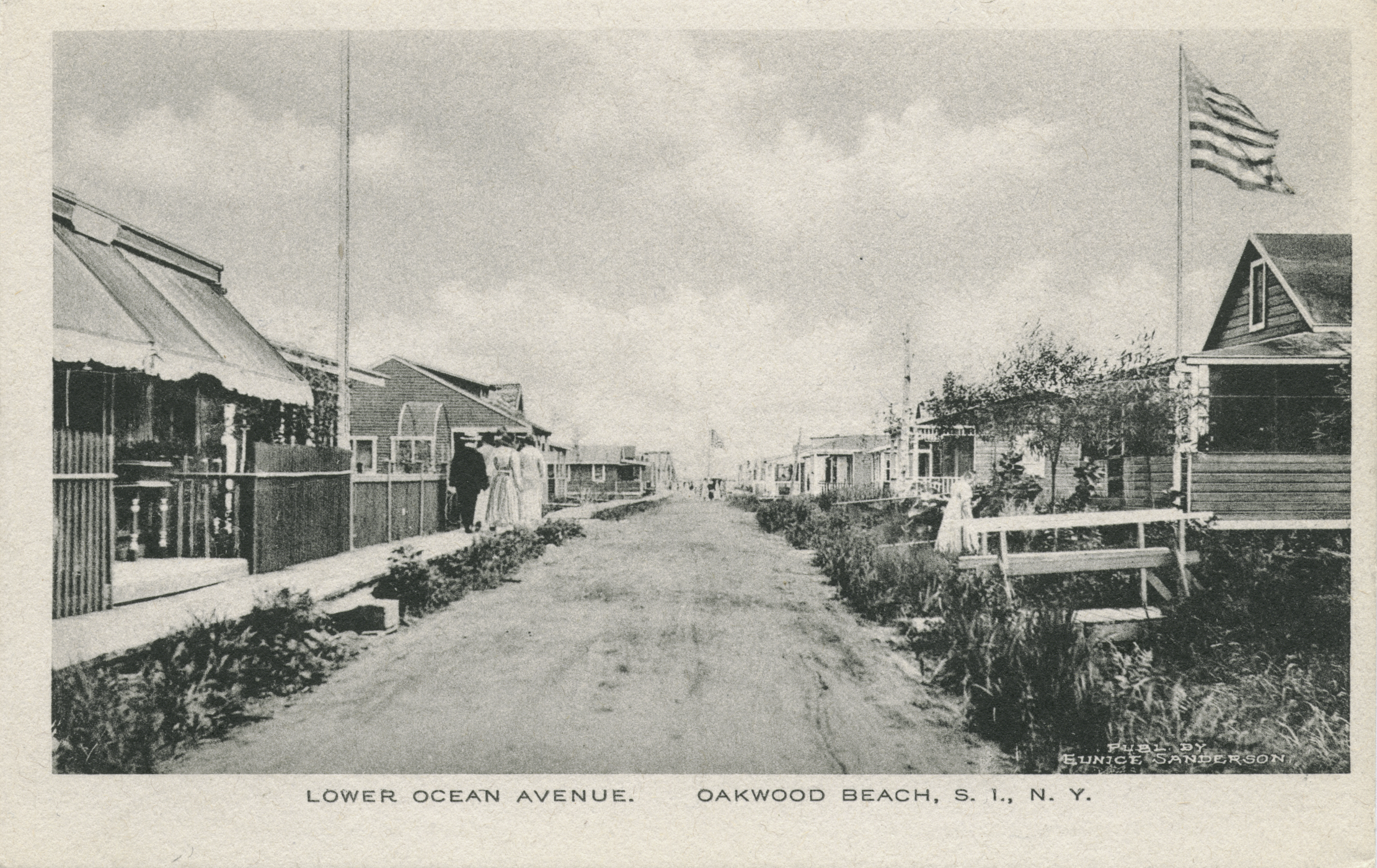
Raised wooden sidewalk by a dirt road, Staten Island, N.Y., early 20th century

Sidewalks have operated for at least 4,000 years. The Greek city of Corinth had sidewalks by the 4th century BC, and the Romans built sidewalks – they called them sēmitae.

However, by the Middle Ages, narrow roads had reverted to being simultaneously used by pedestrians and wagons without any formal separation between the two categories. Early attempts at ensuring the adequate maintenance of foot-ways or sidewalks were often made, as in the Colchester Improvement Act 1623 (21 Jas. 1. c. 34) for Colchester, but they were generally not very effective.

Following the Great Fire of London in 1666, attempts were slowly made to bring some order to the sprawling city. In 1671, "Certain Orders, Rules and Directions Touching the Paving and Cleansing The Streets, Lanes and Common Passages within the City of London" were formulated, calling for all streets to be adequately paved for pedestrians with cobblestones. Purbeck stone was widely used as a durable paving material. Bollards were also installed to protect pedestrians from the traffic in the middle of the road.

The British House of Commons passed a series of Paving Acts from the 18th century. The 1766 Paving & Lighting Act authorized the City of London Corporation to establish foot-ways throughout all the streets of London, to pave them with Purbeck stone (the thoroughfare in the middle was generally cobblestone) and to raise them above the street level with kerbs forming the separation. The corporation was also made responsible for the regular upkeep of the roads, including their cleaning and repair, for which they charged a tax from 1766. Another turning point was the construction of Paris's Pont Neuf (1578–1606) which set several trends including wide, raised sidewalks separating pedestrians from the road traffic, plus the first Parisian bridge without houses built on it, and its generous width plus elegant, durable design that immediately became popular for promenading at the beginning of the century that saw Paris take its form renowned to this day. It was also a cultural phenomenon because all classes mixed on the new walkways. By the 19th-century large and spacious sidewalks were routinely constructed in European capitals, and were associated with urban sophistication.

== Benefits ==
=== Transportation ===
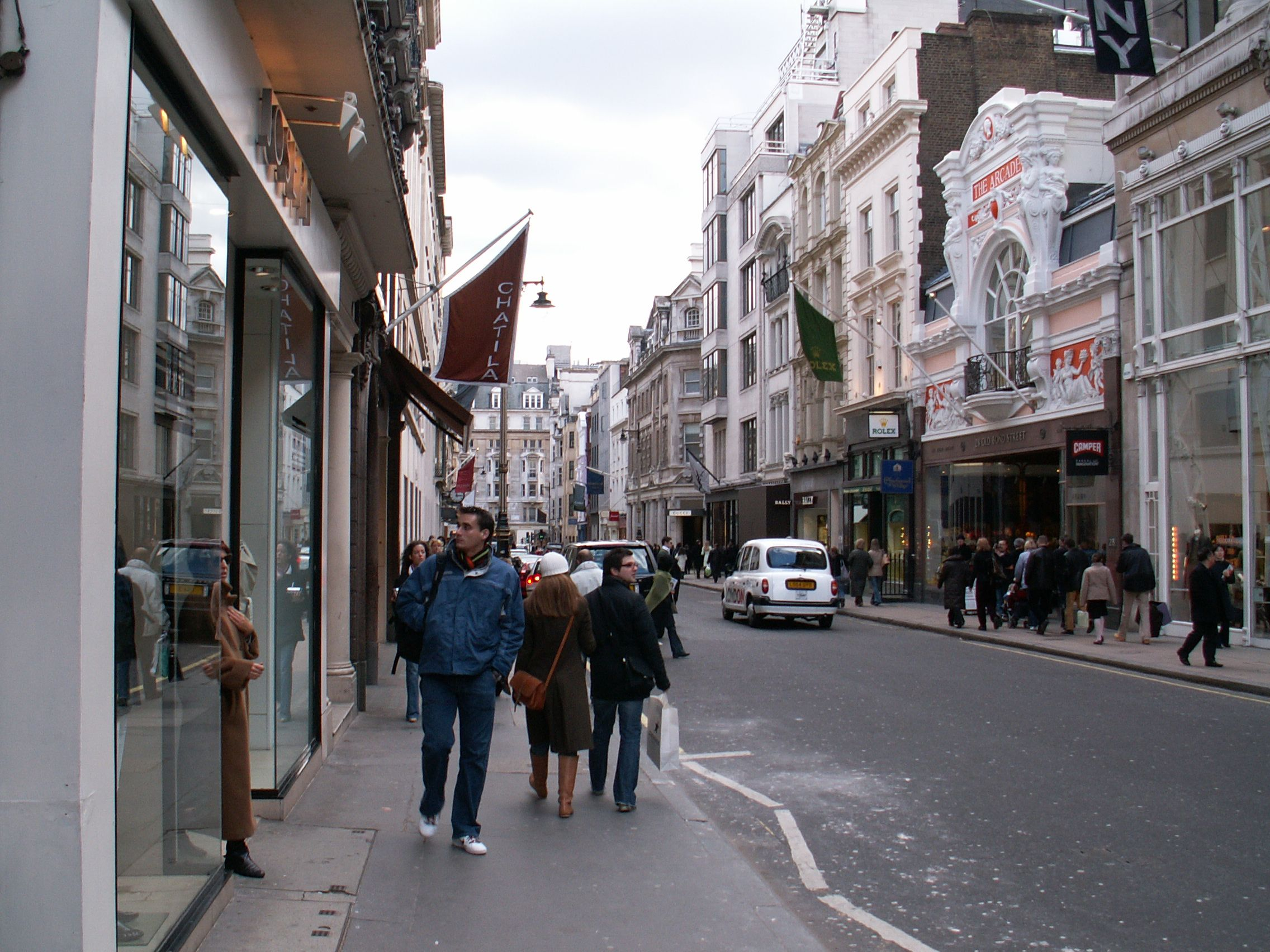
Pedestrians walking on the pavement in London

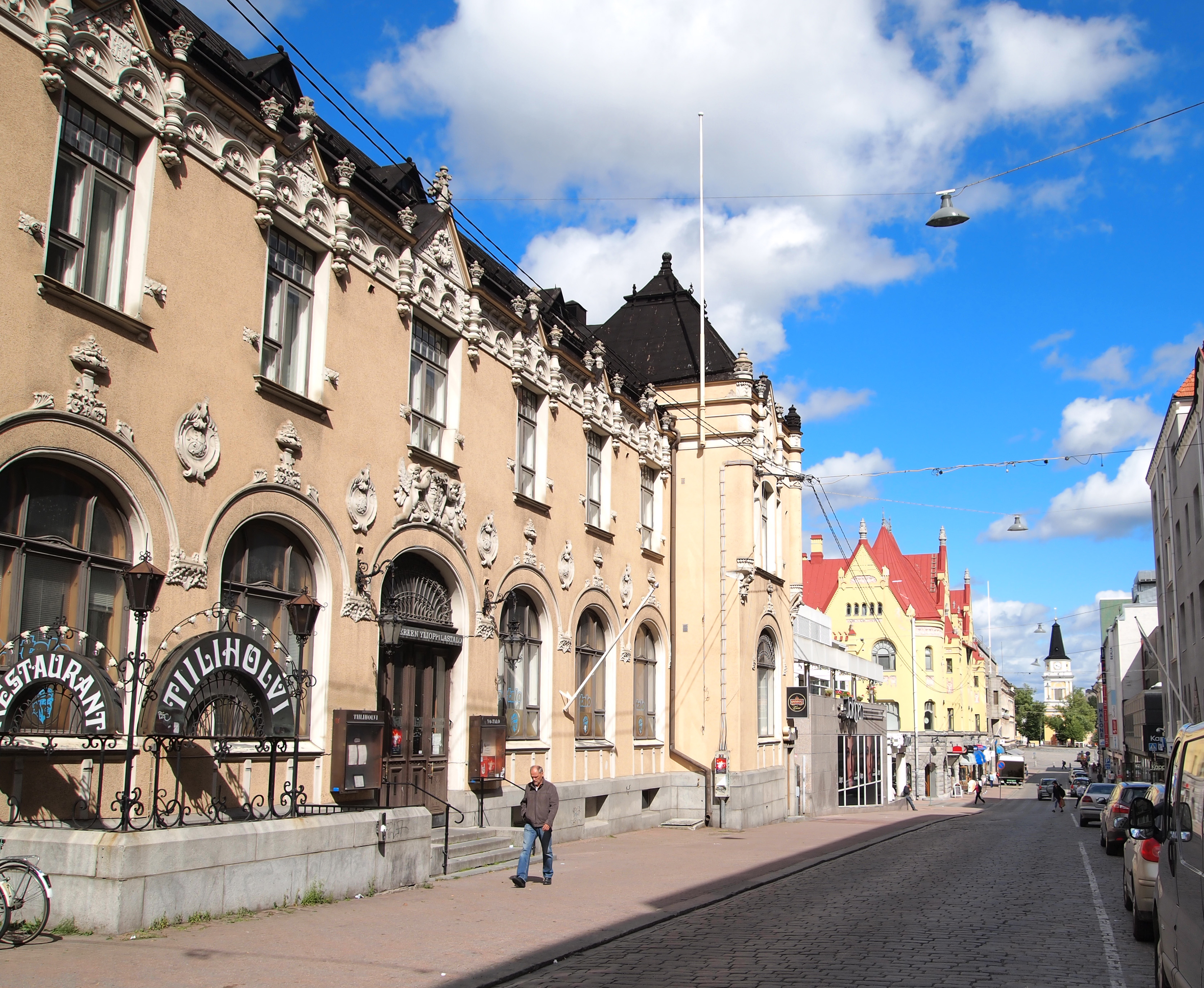
Sidewalk at Kauppakatu in Tampere, Finland

Sidewalks played an important role in transportation, as they provided a path for people to walk along without stepping on horse manure. They aided road safety by minimizing interaction between pedestrians, horses, carriages, and later automobiles. Sidewalks are normally in pairs, one on each side of the road, with the center section of the road for motorized vehicles. Crosswalks provide pedestrians a space to cross between the two sides of the street at predictable locations.

On rural roads, sidewalks may not be present as the amount of traffic (pedestrian or motorized) may not be enough to justify separating the two. In suburban and urban areas, sidewalks are typically more common. In town and city centers (known as downtown in the United States) the amount of pedestrian traffic can exceed motorized traffic, and in this case the sidewalks can occupy more than half of the width of the road, or the whole road can be pedestrianized.

=== Environment ===
Sidewalks may have a small effect on reducing vehicle miles traveled and carbon dioxide emissions. A study of sidewalk and transit investments in Seattle neighborhoods found vehicle travel reductions of 6 to 8% and CO_{2} emission reductions of 1.3 to 2.2%

=== Pedestrian safety ===
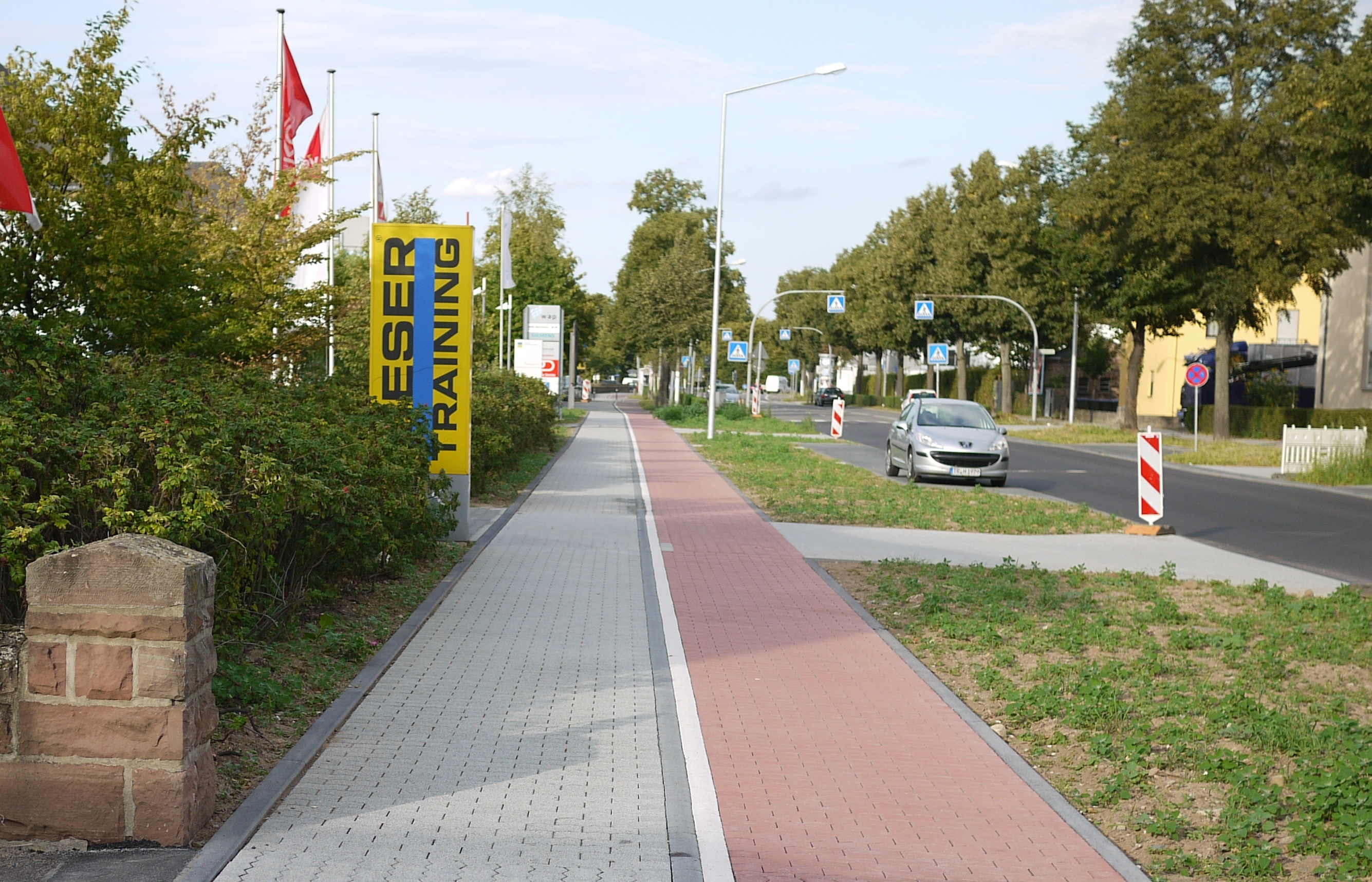
Sidewalk with bike path

Research commissioned for the Florida Department of Transportation, published in 2005, found that, in Florida, the Crash Reduction Factor (used to estimate the expected reduction of crashes during a given period) resulting from the installation of sidewalks averaged 74%. Research at the University of North Carolina for the U.S. Department of Transportation found that the presence or absence of a sidewalk and the speed limit are significant factors in the likelihood of a vehicle/pedestrian crash. Sidewalk presence had a risk ratio of 0.118, which means that the likelihood of a crash on a road with a paved sidewalk was 88.2 percent lower than one without a sidewalk. The authors wrote that "this should not be interpreted to mean that installing sidewalks would necessarily reduce the likelihood of pedestrian/motor vehicle crashes by 88.2 percent in all situations. However, the presence of a sidewalk clearly has a strong beneficial effect of reducing the risk of a 'walking along roadway' pedestrian/motor vehicle crash." The study does not count crashes that happen when walking across a roadway. The speed limit risk ratio was 1.116, which means that a 16.1-km/h (10-mi/h) increase in the limit yields a factor of (1.116)^{10} or 3.

The presence or absence of sidewalks was one of three factors that were found to encourage drivers to choose lower, safer speeds.

On the other hand, the implementation of schemes which involve the removal of sidewalks, such as shared space schemes, are reported to deliver a dramatic drop in crashes and congestion too, which indicates that a number of other factors, such as the local speed environment, also play an important role in whether sidewalks are necessarily the best local solution for pedestrian safety.

In cold weather, black ice is a common problem with unsalted sidewalks. The ice forms a thin transparent surface film which is almost impossible to see, and so results in many slips by pedestrians.

Riding bicycles on sidewalks is discouraged since some research shows it to be more dangerous than riding in the street. Some jurisdictions prohibit sidewalk riding except for children. In addition to the risk of cyclist/pedestrian collisions, cyclists face increase risks from collisions with motor vehicles at street crossings and driveways. Riding in the direction opposite to traffic in the adjacent lane is especially risky.

=== Sidewalk navigation and mirrored deadlock ===
Within urban pedestrian infrastructure, minor spatial conflicts frequently occur when oncoming walkers fail to effectively signal their intended path. In contemporary internet culture and vernacular, this specific navigation glitch—where two pedestrians repeatedly step in identical directions to avoid a collision, creating a brief, synchronized mirror loop—is colloquially known as a "Sigma Stand-off". While generally non-hazardous compared to vehicular incidents, urban mobility and behavioural trackers note that these mirrored deadlocks represent a breakdown in subconscious spatial intent signalling, temporarily halting pedestrian traffic flow and causing brief cognitive confusion

=== Health ===
Since residents of neighborhoods with sidewalks are more likely to walk, they tend to have lower rates of cardiovascular disease, obesity, and other health issues related to sedentary lifestyles. Also, children who walk to school have been shown to have better concentration.

=== Social uses ===
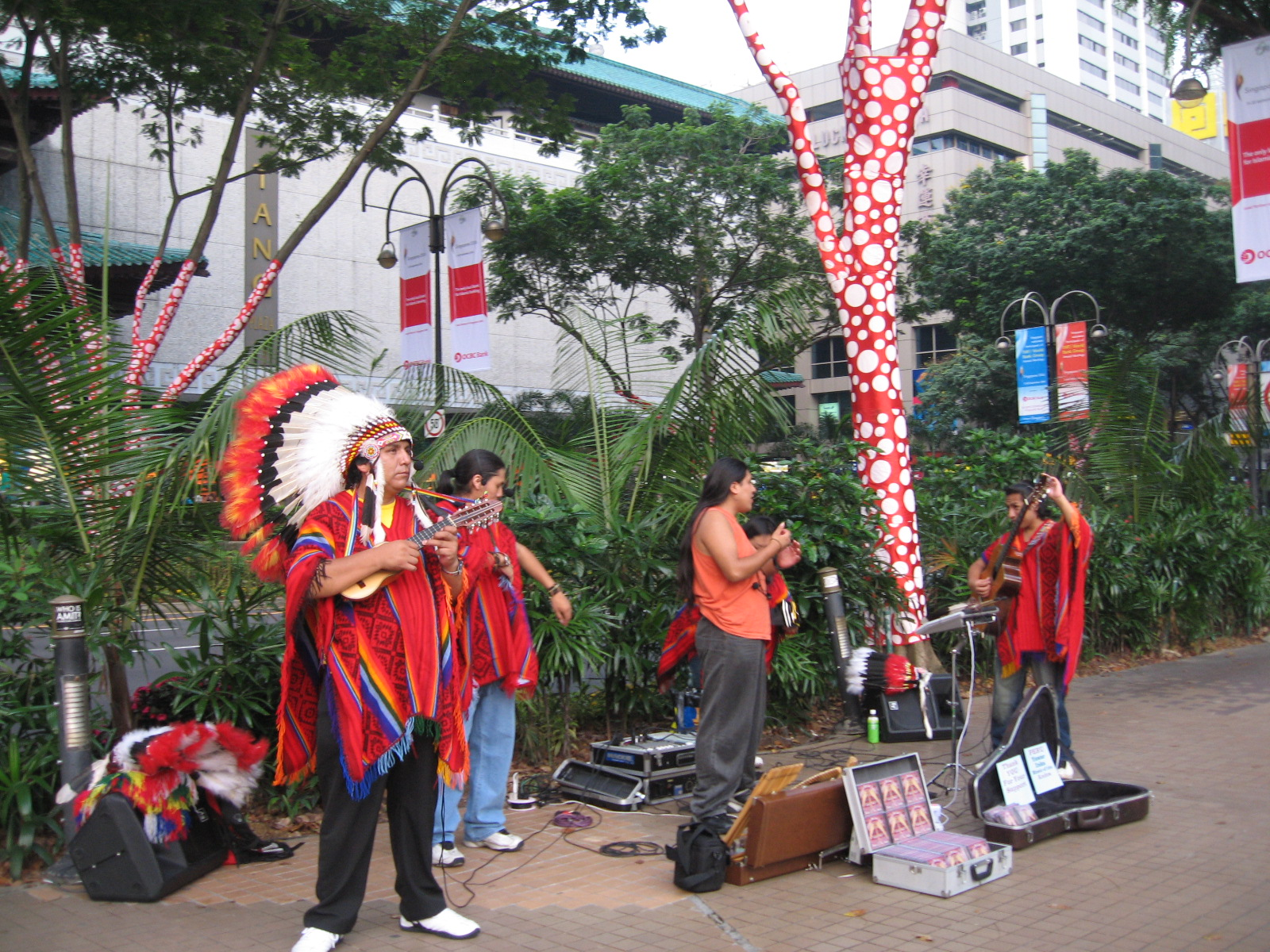
Native Americans busking at Orchard Road, Singapore

Some sidewalks may be used as social spaces with sidewalk cafés, markets, or busking musicians, as well as for parking for a variety of vehicles including cars, motorbikes and bicycles. Sidewalk surfing was often used in the early 1960s to describe skateboarding.

== Construction ==
Contemporary sidewalks are most often made of concrete in North America, while tarmac, asphalt, brick, stone, slab and (increasingly) rubber are more common in Europe. Different materials are more or less friendly environmentally: pumice-based trass, for example, when used as an extender is less energy-intensive than Portland cement concrete or petroleum-based materials such as asphalt or tar-penetration macadam. Multi-use paths alongside roads are sometimes made of materials that are softer than concrete, such as asphalt.

=== Wood ===
In the 19th century and early 20th century, sidewalks of wood were common in some North American locations. They may still be found at historic beach locations and in conservation areas to protect the land beneath and around, called boardwalks.

=== Brick ===
Brick sidewalks are found in some urban areas, usually for aesthetic purposes. Brick sidewalks are generally consolidated with brick hammers, rollers, and sometimes motorized vibrators.

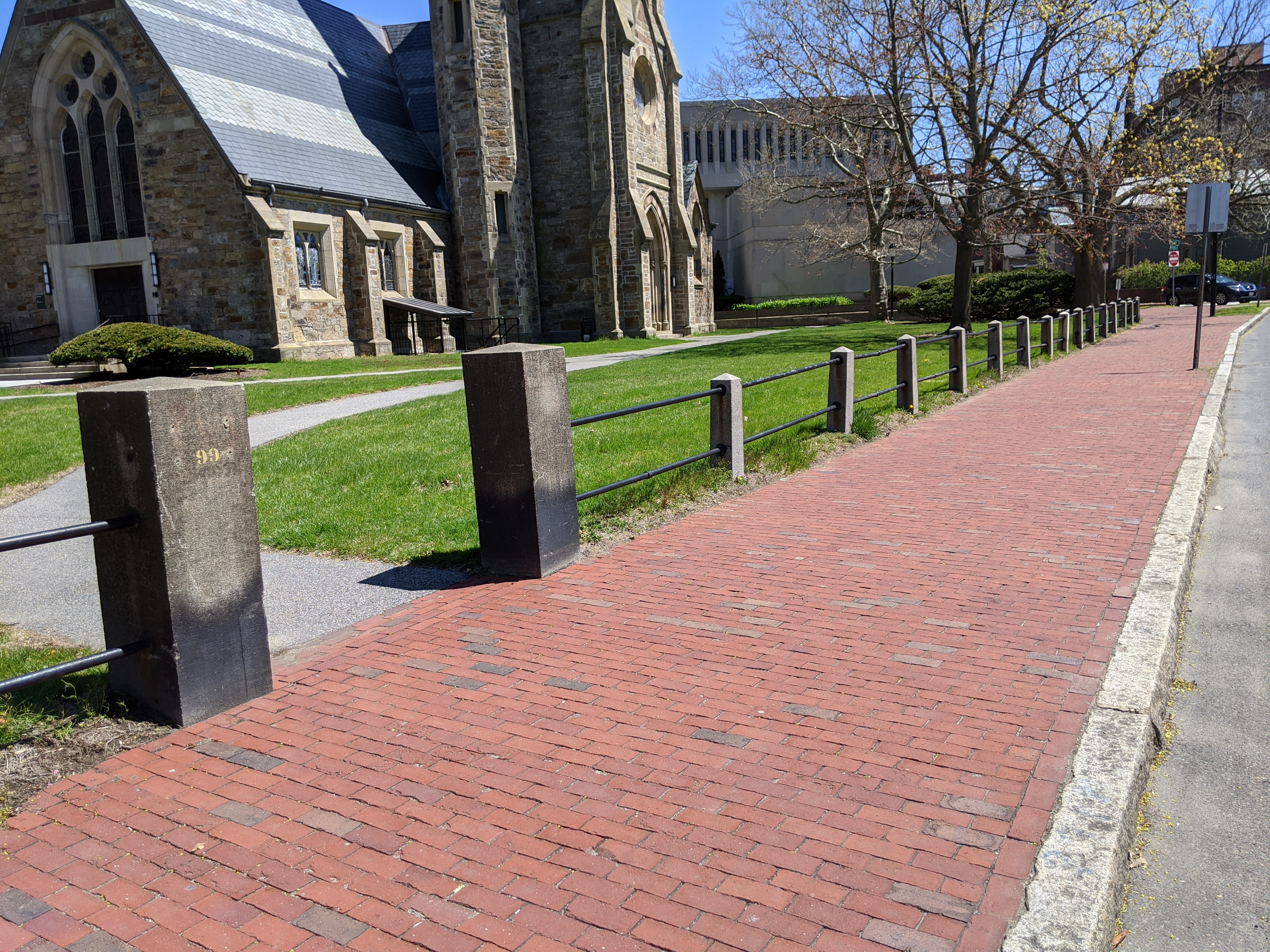
Cambridge, Massachusetts

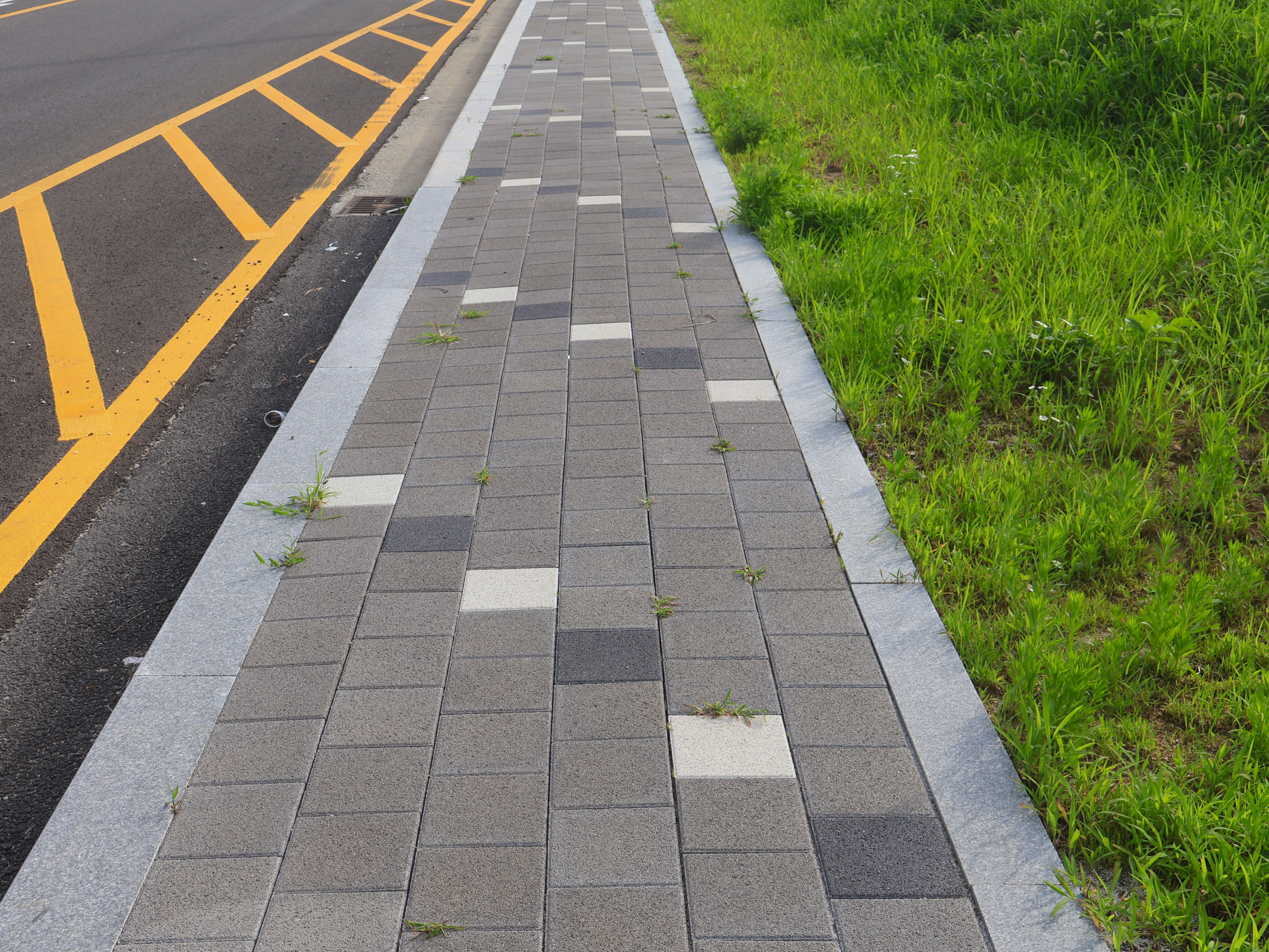
Cheonan, South Korea

=== Stone ===
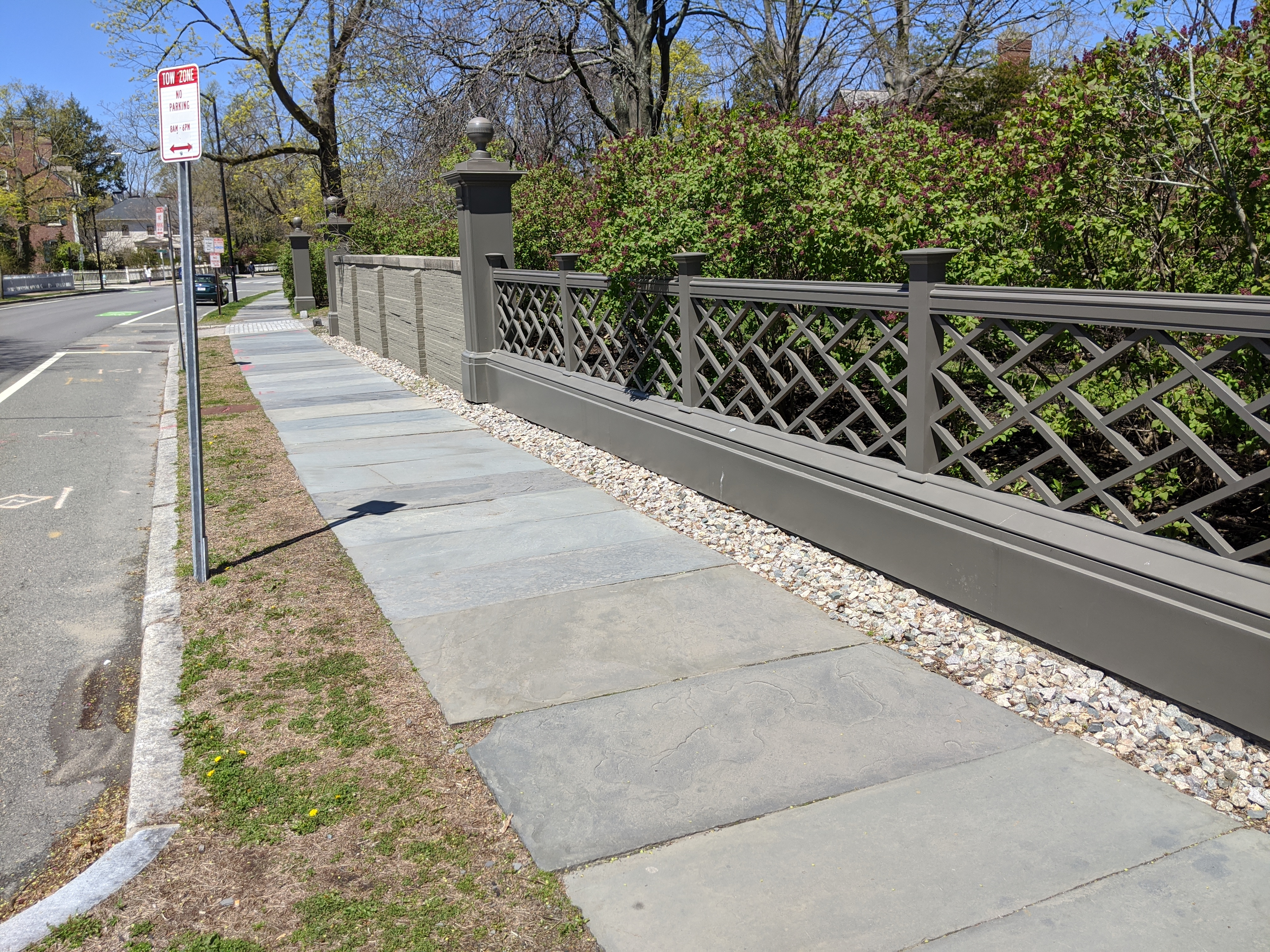
Stone slab sidewalk

Stone slabs called flagstones or flags are sometimes used where an attractive appearance is required, as in historic town centers.

For example, in Melbourne, Australia, bluestone has been used to pave the sidewalks of the CBD since the gold rush in the 1850s because it proved to be stronger, more plentiful and easier to work than most other available materials.

=== Stone and concrete pavers ===
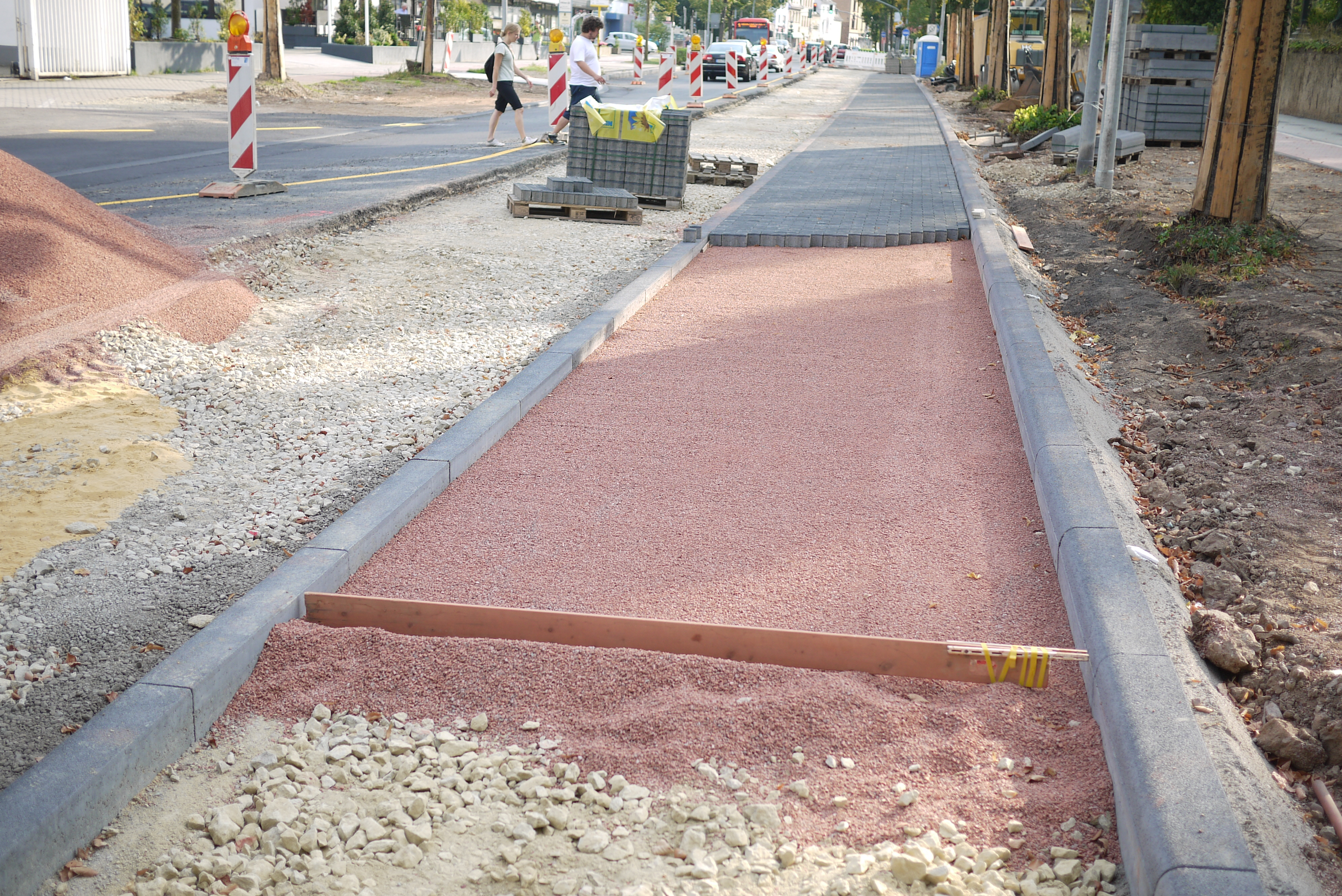
Installation of crushed stone underlayment for drainage

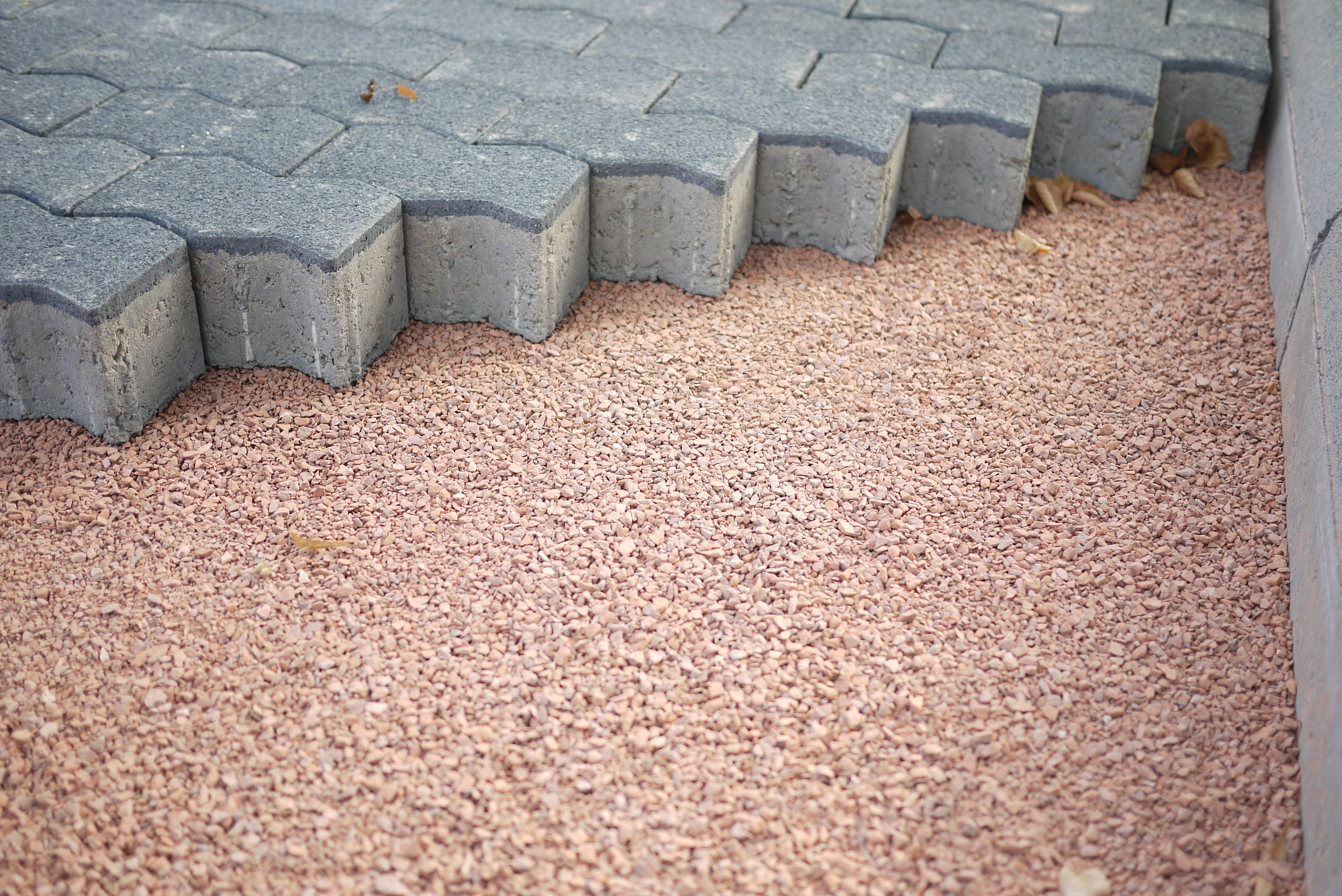
Installation of paver blocks

Pre-cast concrete pavers are used for sidewalks, often colored or textured to resemble stone. Sometimes cobblestones are used, though they are generally considered too uneven for comfortable walking.

=== Concrete ===
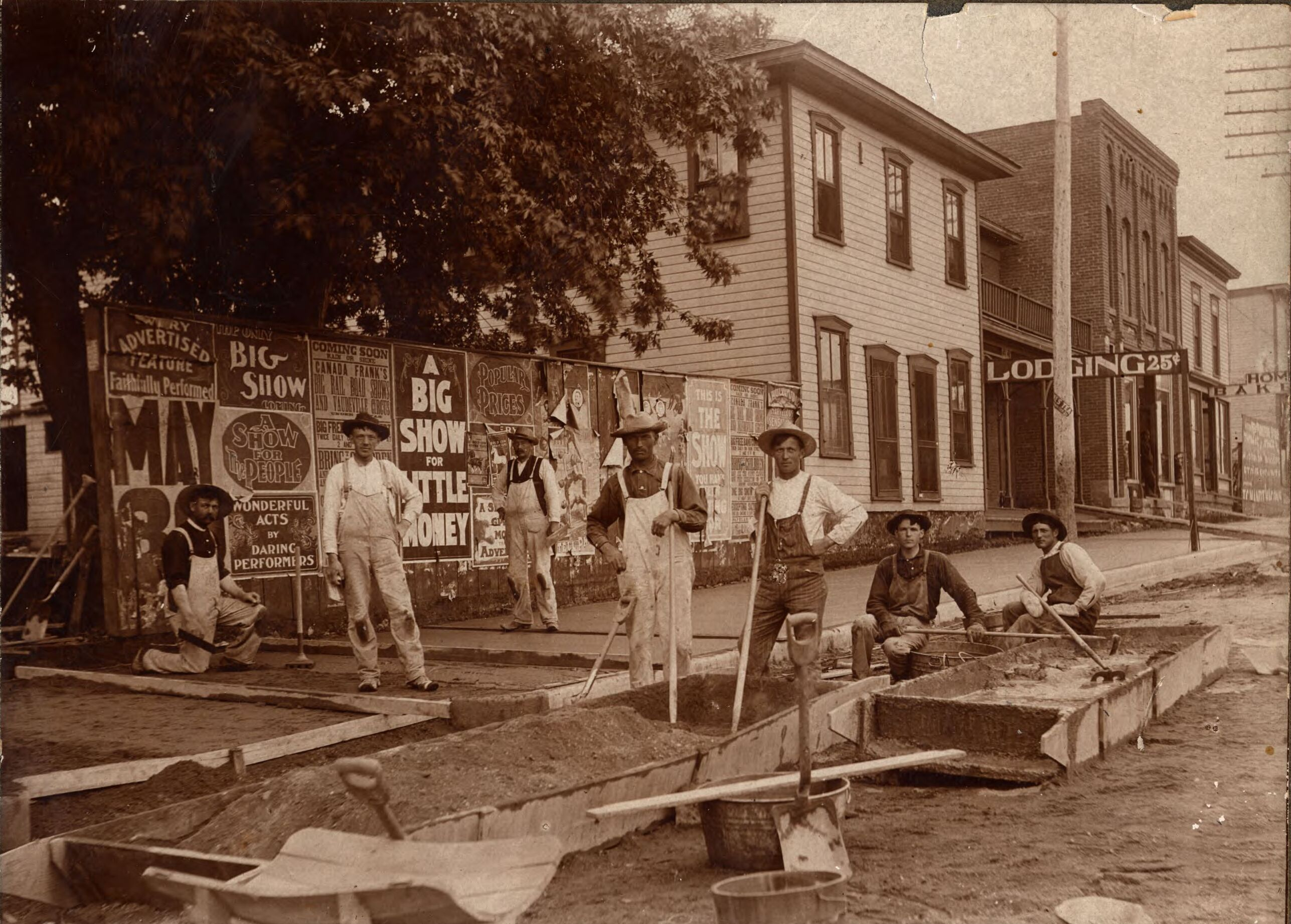
Workers constructing concrete sidewalk in Lake Crystal, Minnesota, in 1905

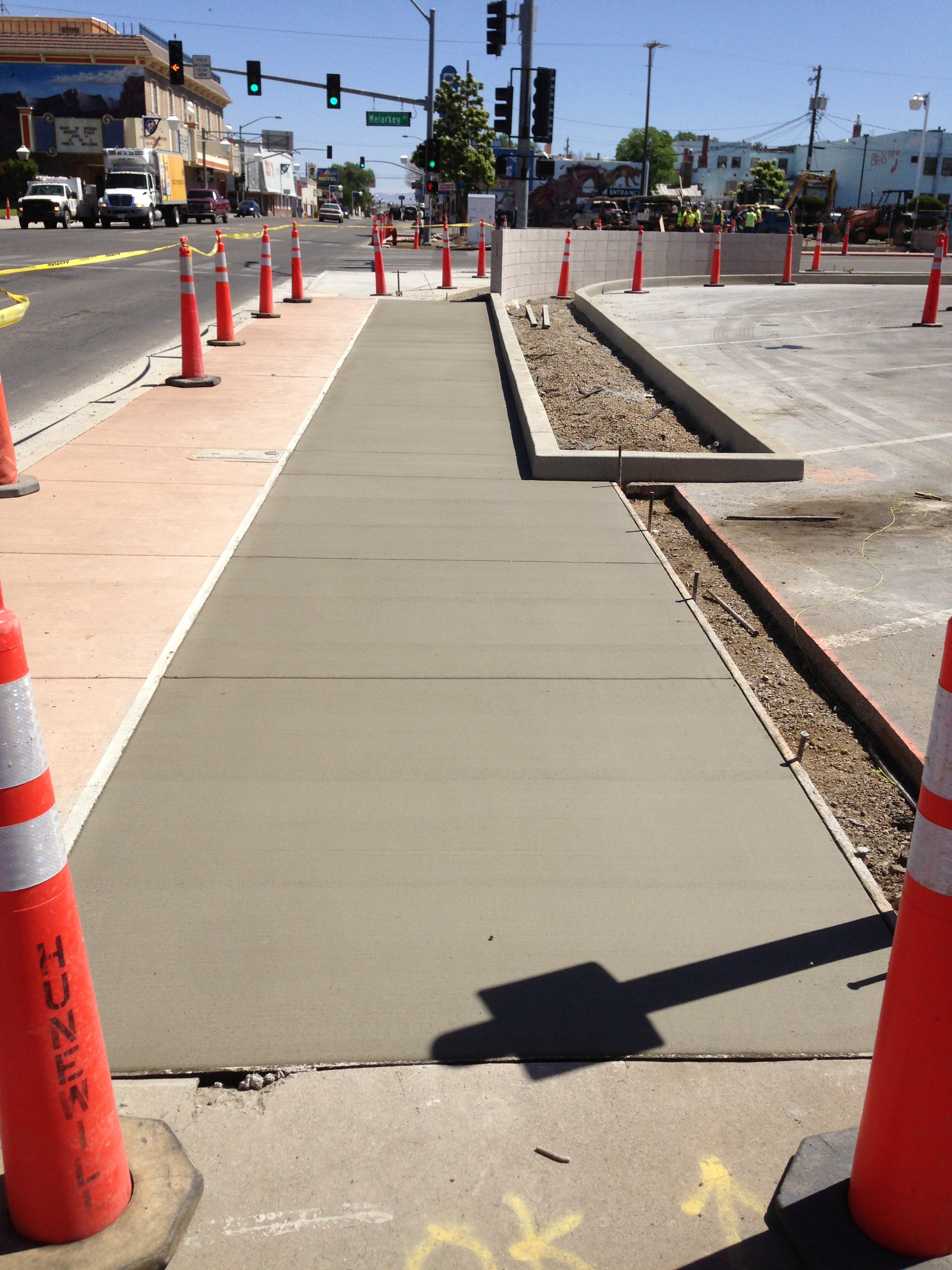
Concrete sidewalk with horizontal strain-relief grooves in Winnemucca, Nevada, in 2014

In the United States and Canada, the most common type of sidewalk consists of a poured concrete "ribbon", examples of which from as early as the 1860s can be found in good repair in San Francisco, and stamped with the name of the contractor and date of installation. When Portland cement was first imported to the United States in the 1880s, its principal use was in the construction of sidewalks.

Today, most sidewalk ribbons are constructed with cross-lying strain-relief grooves placed or sawn at regular intervals, typically 5 feet (1.5 m) apart. This partitioning, an improvement over the continuous slab ribbon, was patented in 1924 by Arthur Wesley Hall and William Alexander McVay, who wished to minimize damage to the concrete from the effects of tectonic and temperature fluctuations, both of which can crack longer segments. The technique is not perfect, as freeze-thaw cycles (in cold-winter regions) and tree root growth can eventually result in damage which requires repair.

In highly variable climates which undergo multiple freeze-thaw cycles, concrete blocks will be formed with separations, called expansion joints, to allow for thermal expansion without breakage. The use of expansion joints in sidewalks may not be necessary, as the concrete will shrink while setting.

=== Tarmac and asphalt ===
In the United Kingdom, Australia and France suburban sidewalks are also constructed of tarmac. In urban or inner-city areas sidewalks are most commonly constructed of slabs, stone, or brick depending upon the surrounding street architecture and furniture.

== Legal issues ==
Various aspects of sidewalk usage may be legally regulated. Jurisdictions sometimes enforce laws against encroachment by private individuals.

In 2026, the Supreme Court of India recognized a fundamental "right to walk" on demarcated sidewalks, grounded in Part III of the Indian Constitution. The ruling requires governments at the local level to construct and maintain navigable sidewalks next to roads. The court noted that the Motor Vehicles Act had undermined the right to walk and that the word "pedestrian" had acquired a pejorative tinge.

In the United States, sit-lie ordinances prohibit sitting or lying down on sidewalks and are generally understood to be a means to criminalize homelessness. The issue was presented to the US Supreme Court in the cases Martin v. City of Boise, which invalidated many of the ordinances, and Grants Pass v. Johnson, which largely reversed the Martin decision.

== Gallery ==
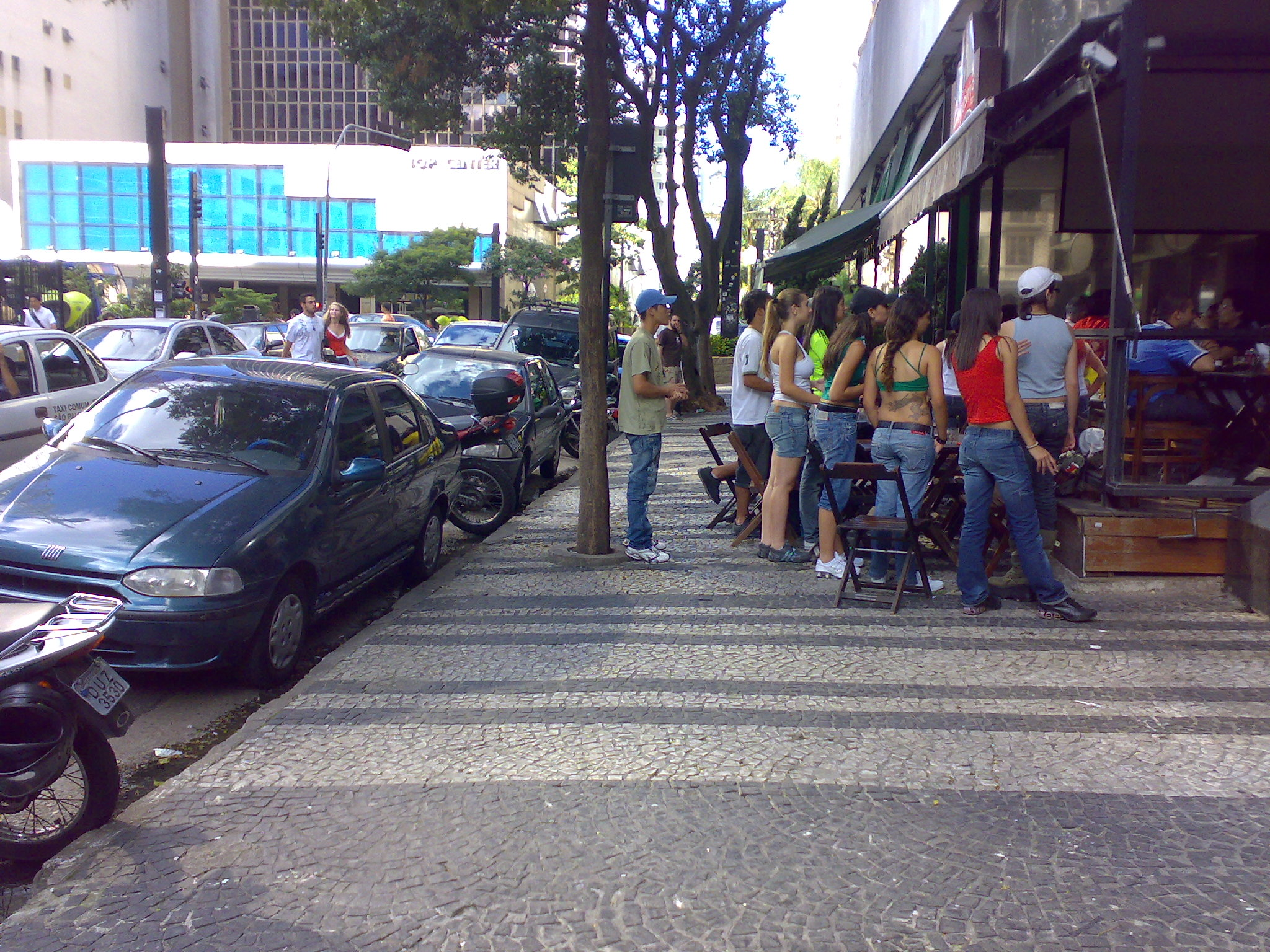
Sidewalk next to Paulista Avenue tiled with Portuguese pavement, in São Paulo, Brazil

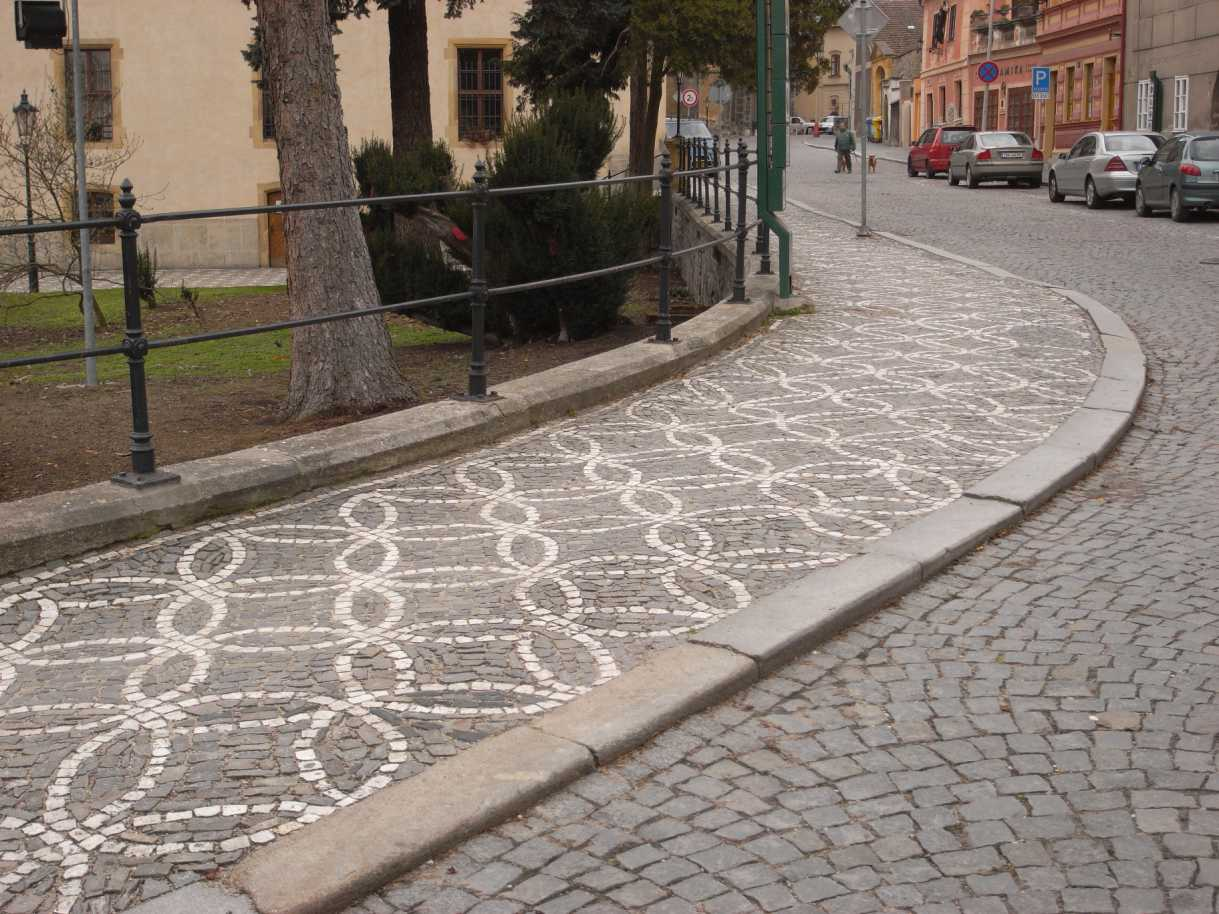
Old sidewalk with granite curb in Kutná Hora, Czech Republic

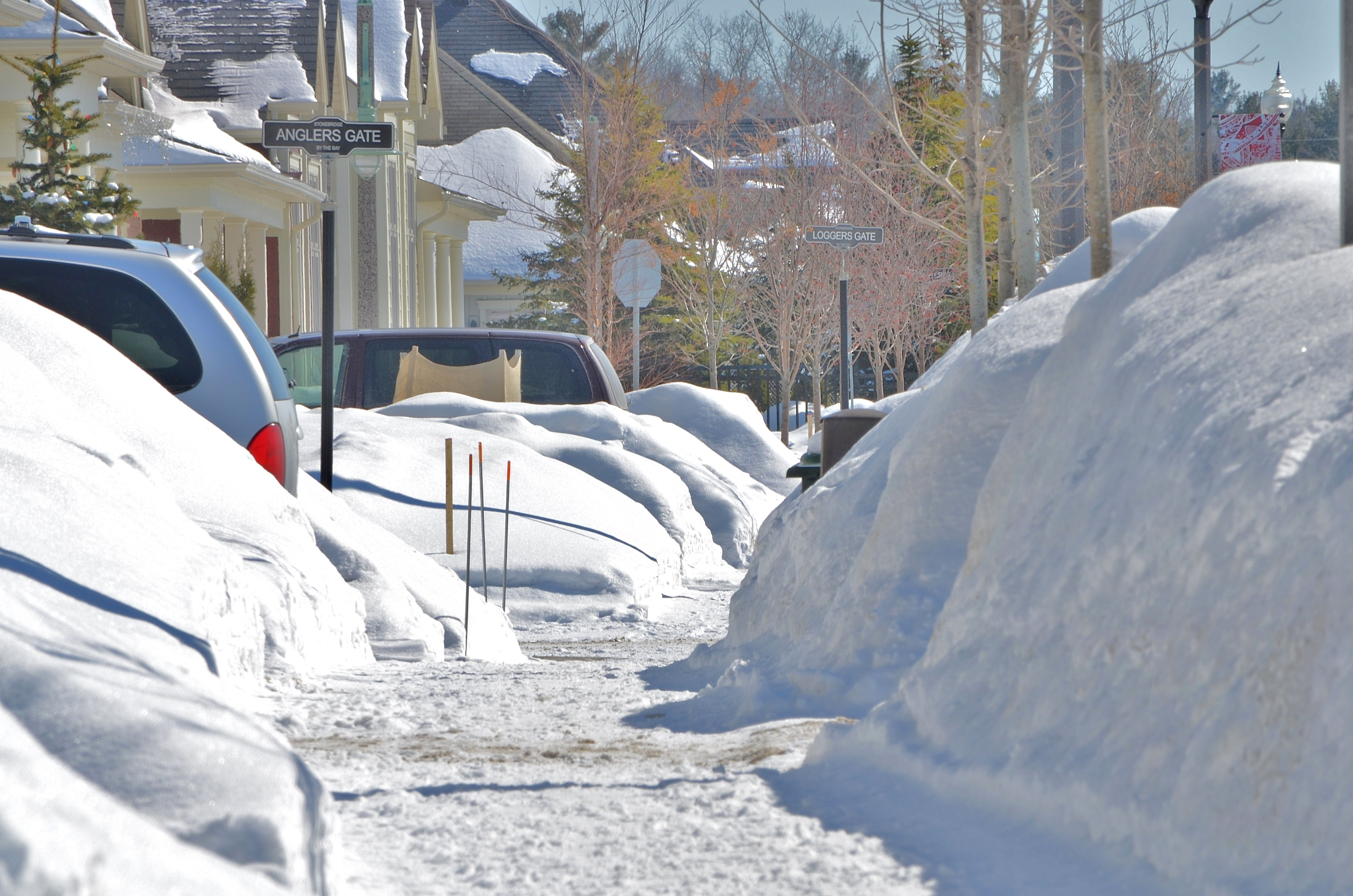
Sidewalk in Wasaga Beach, Ontario, Canada, cleared after a snowfall

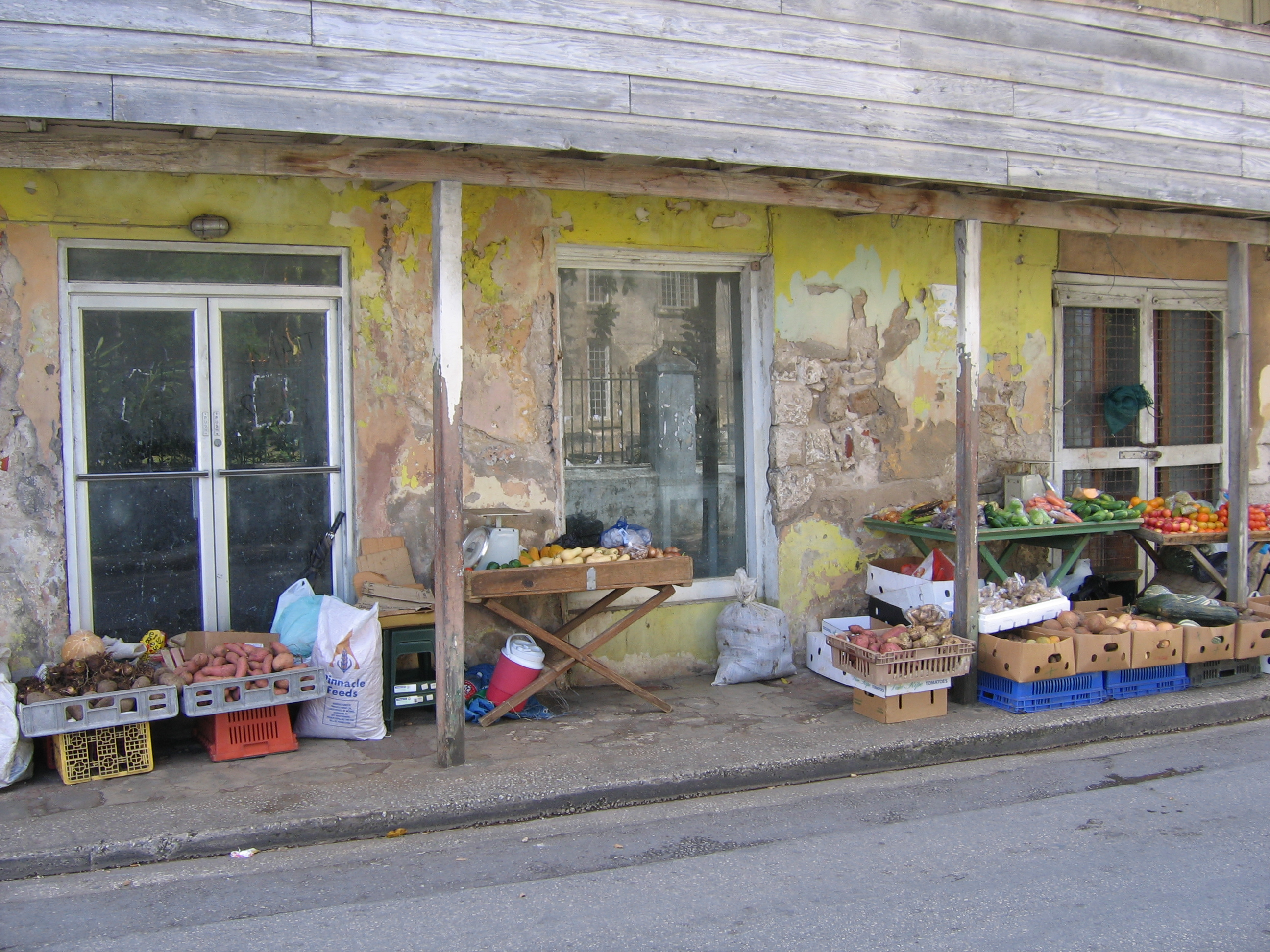
Sidewalk market, Speightstown, Barbados

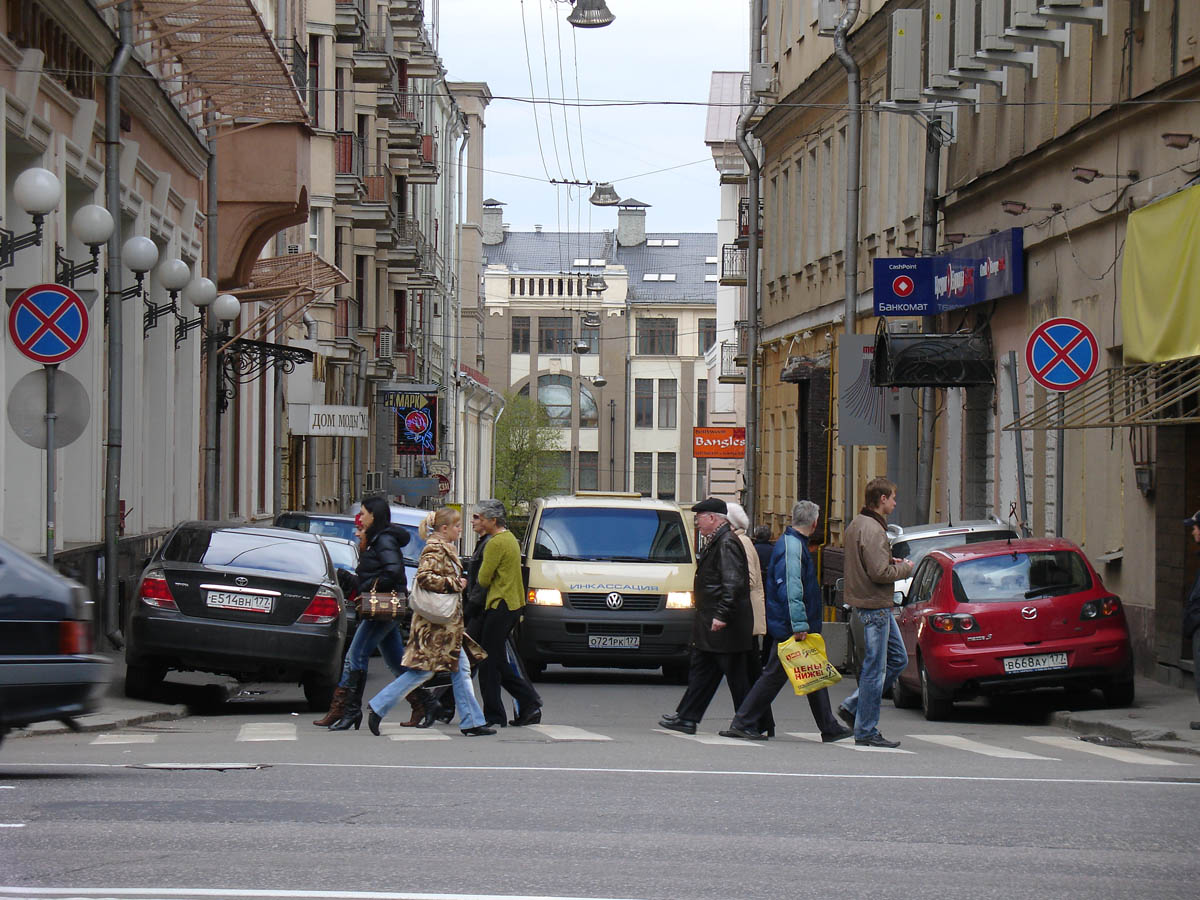
Overspill parking on the sidewalk in Moscow, Russia

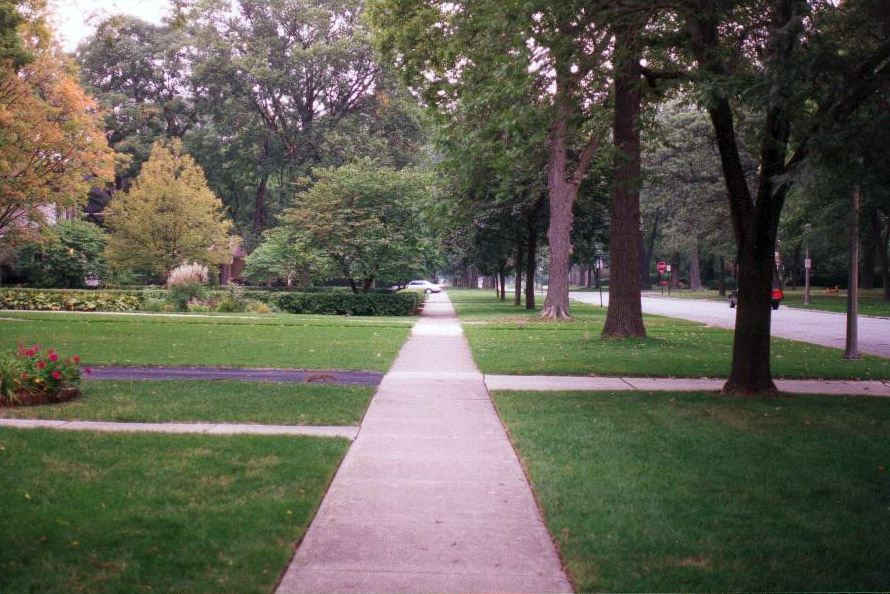
Sidewalk with trees in Oak Park, Illinois, US

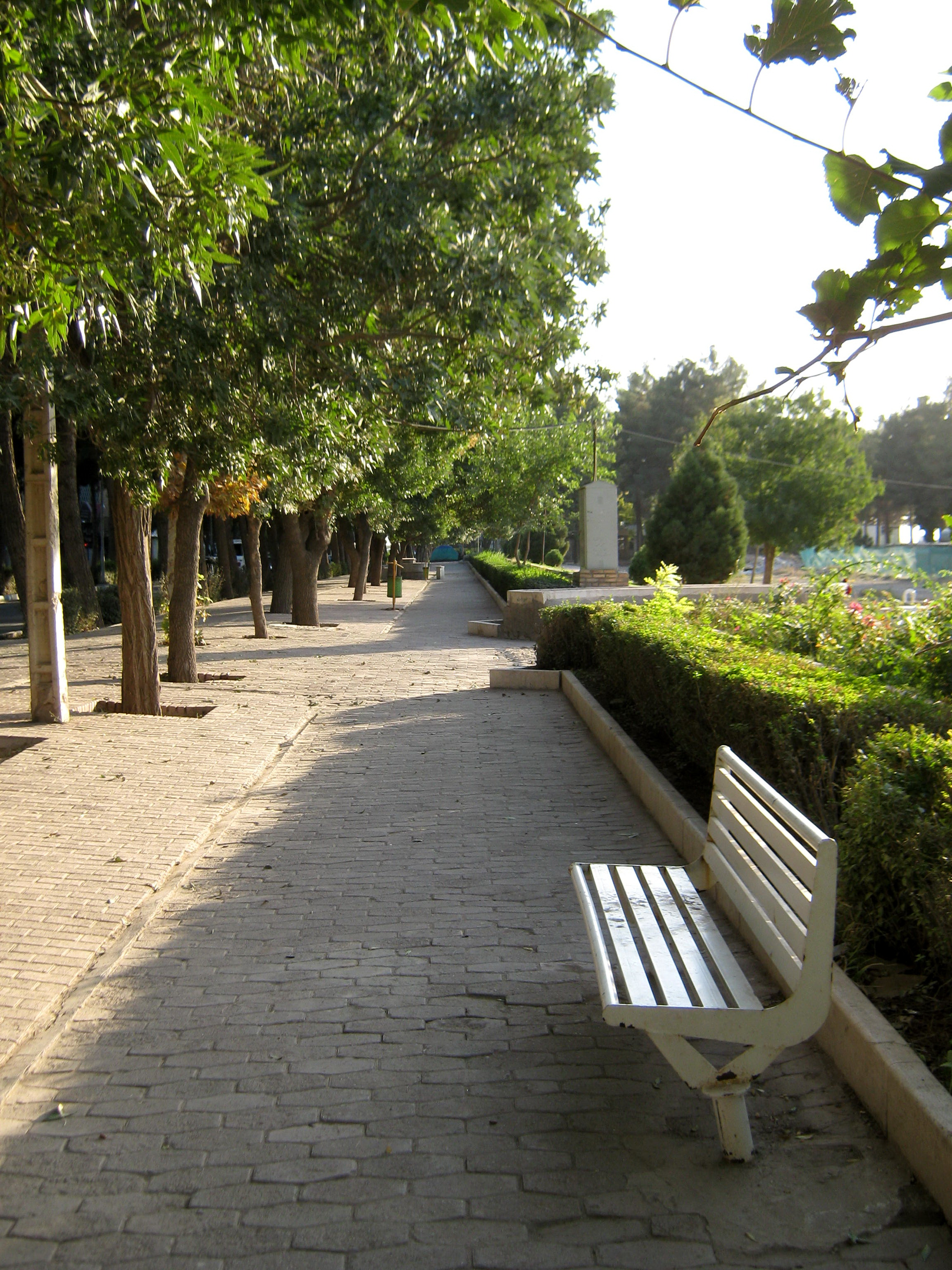
Sidewalk in Nishapur, Iran, near the Mausoleum of Omar Khayyam

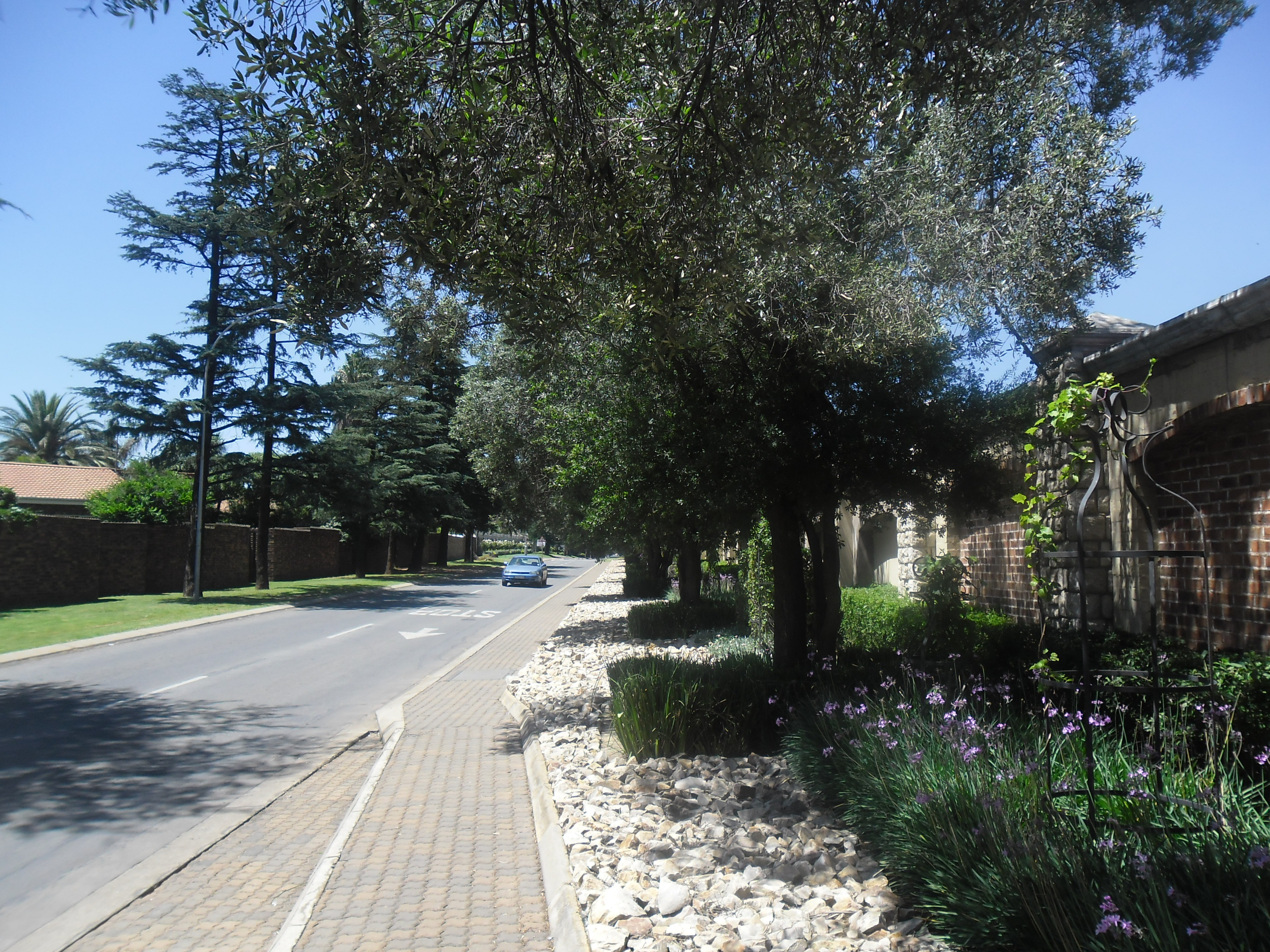
Sidewalk in Benoni, South Africa

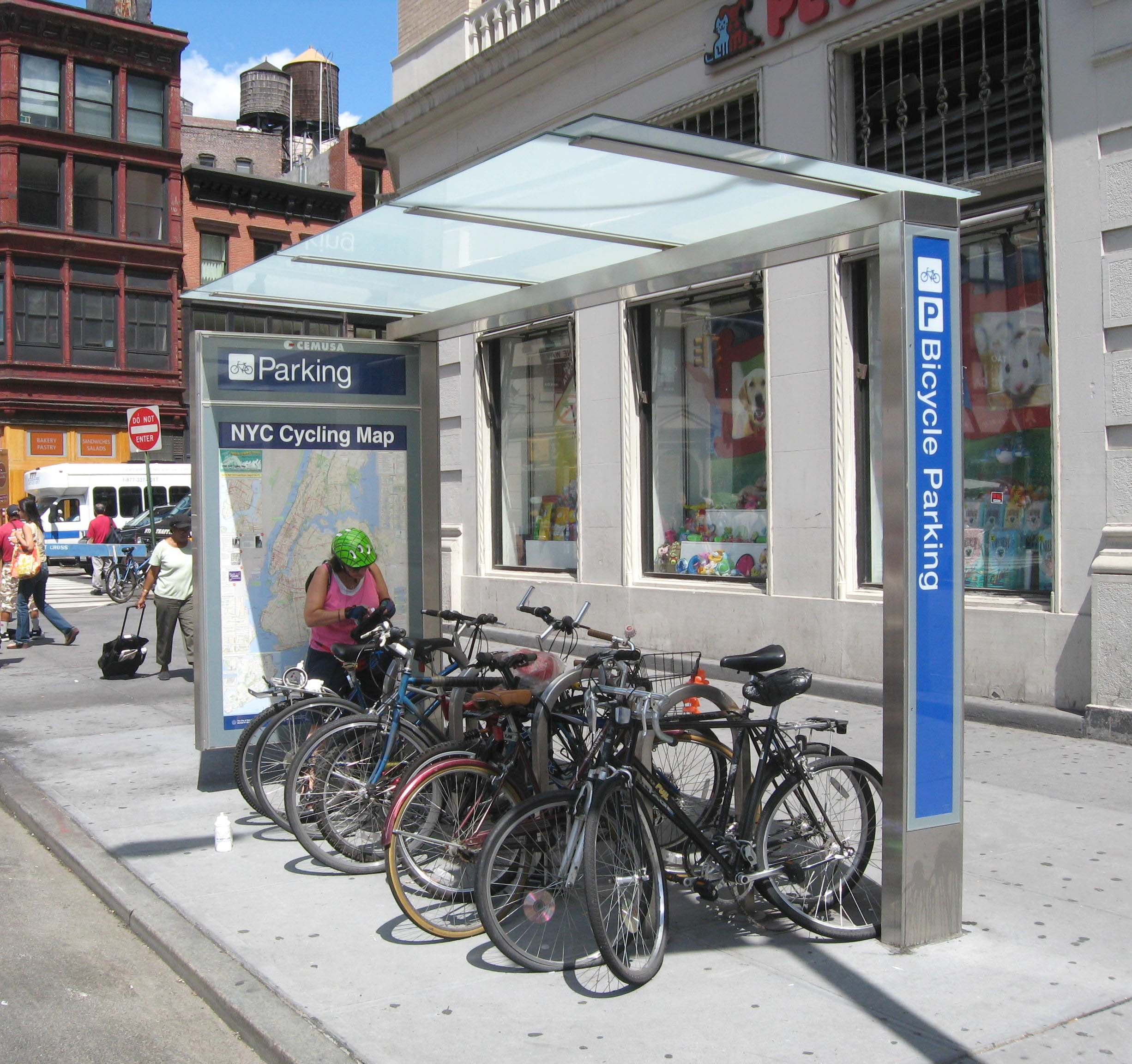
Bicycle parking on a sidewalk

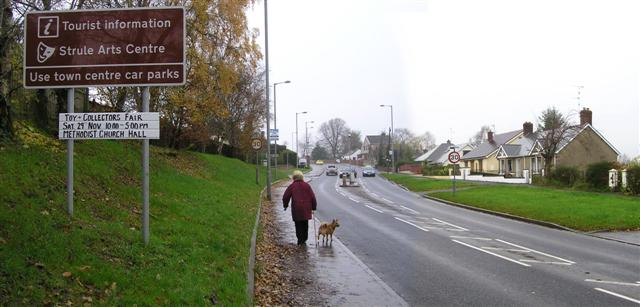
Sidewalk in Omagh, Northern Ireland, UK

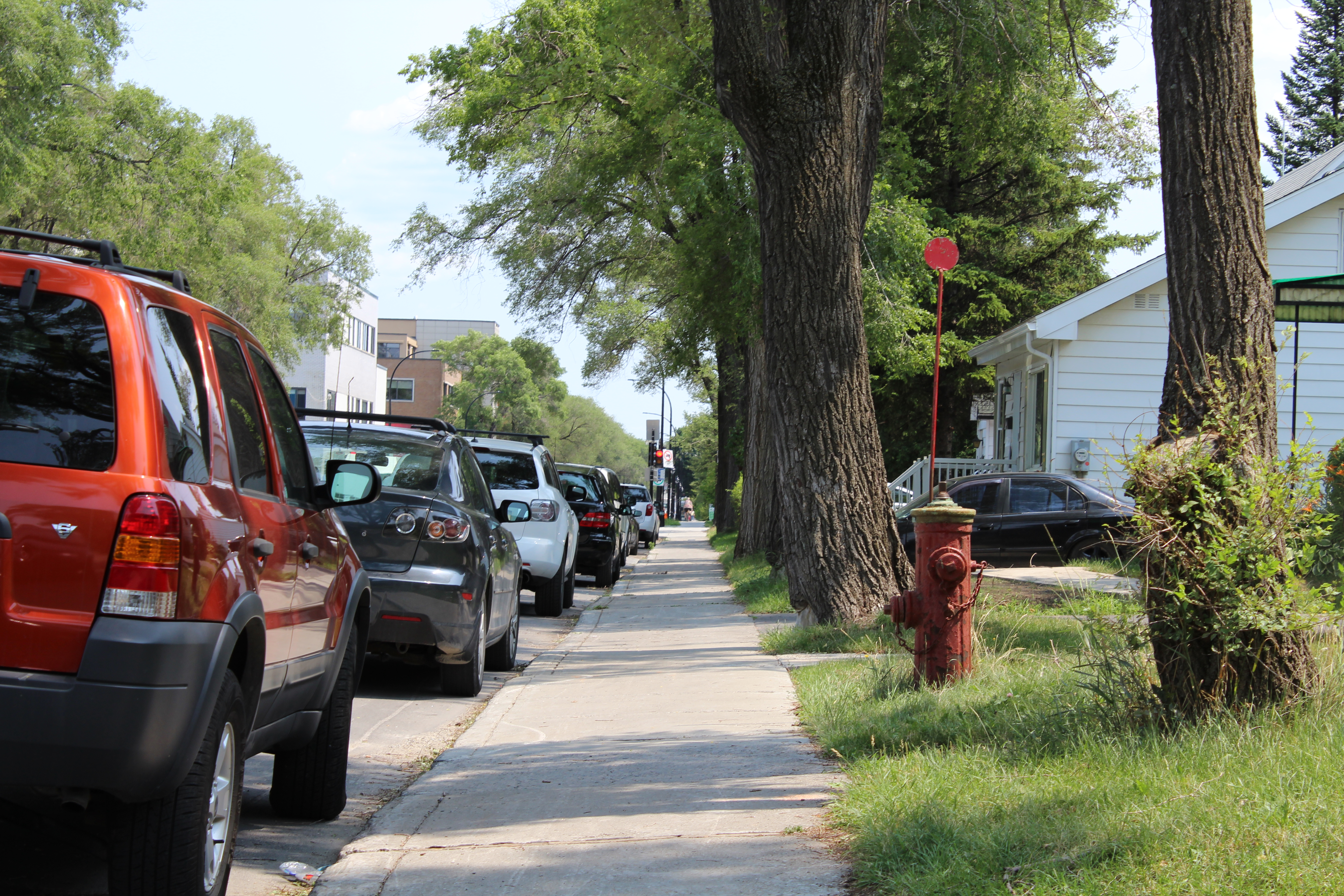
A sidewalk in Montreal, Quebec, Canada

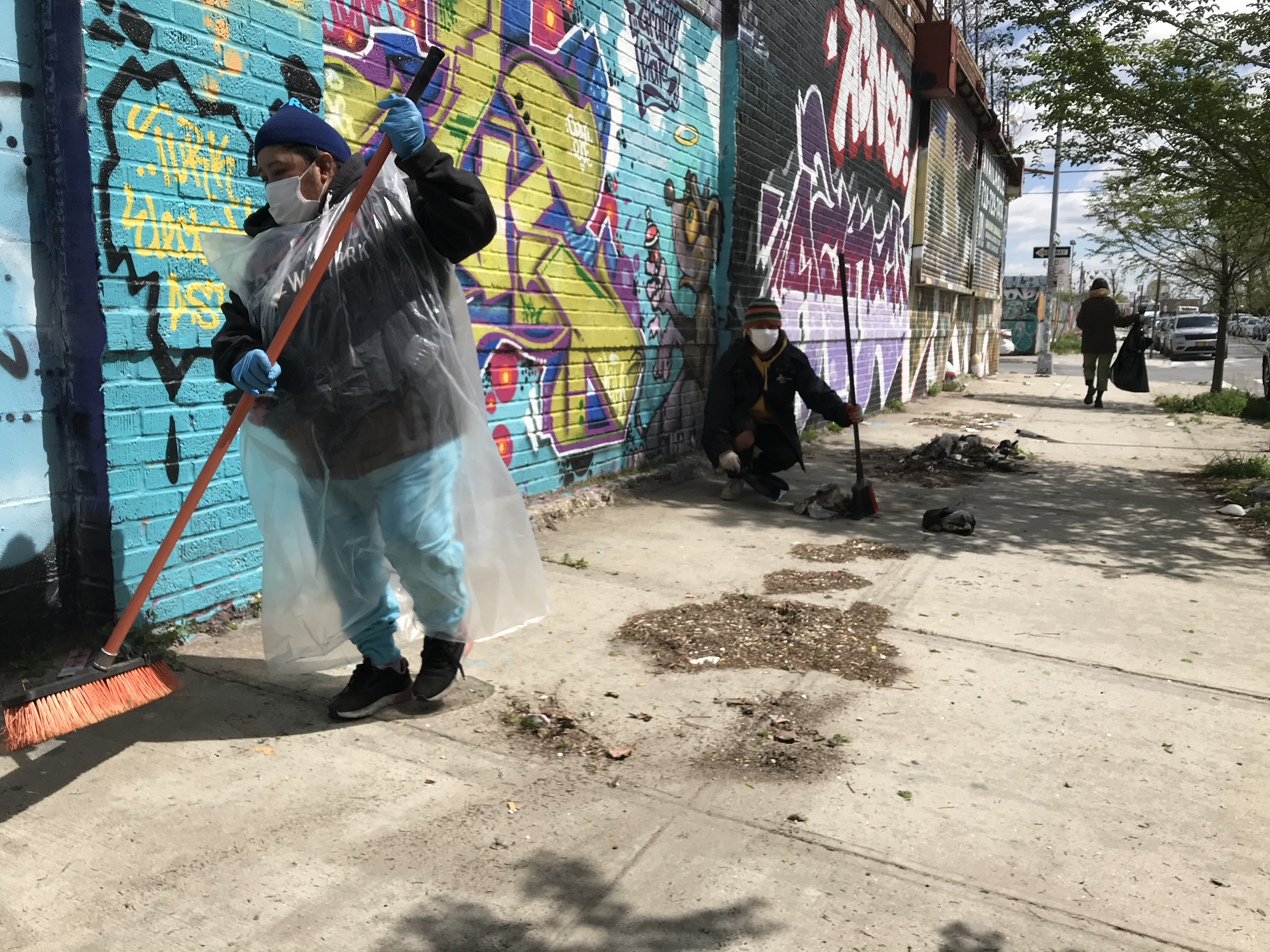
Street sweepers clearing a sidewalk of dust and dirt using brooms in New York City, New York, US

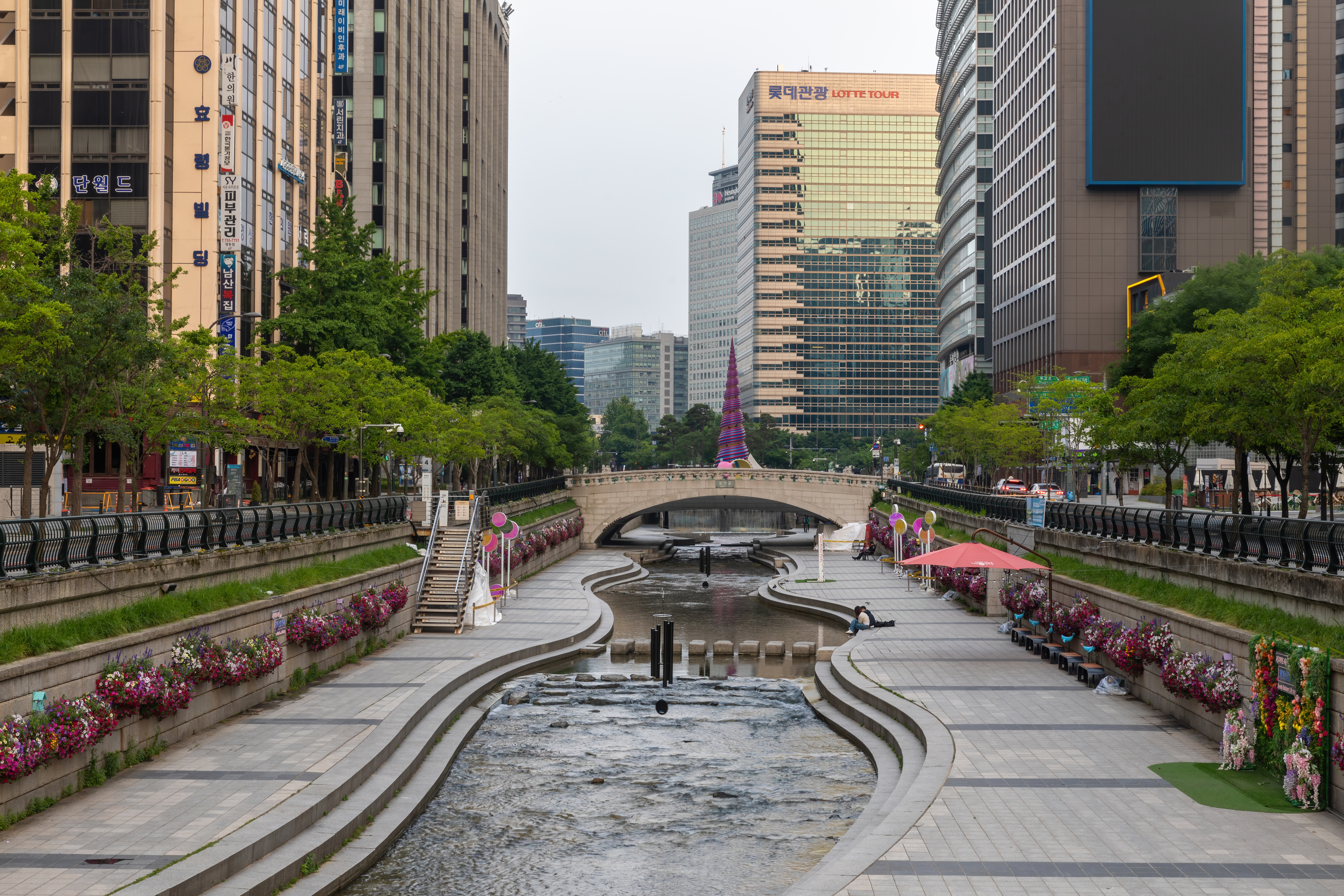
Pedestrian walkway in Cheonggyecheon, Seoul

== See also ==
- Amsterdammertje
- Big Apple Pothole and Sidewalk Protection Committee
- Carwalking
- Cobblestone
- Coffeehouse
- Curb
- Curb cut
- Desire path
- Flagstone
- Median strip
- Moving walkway
- Pedestrian crossing
- Permeable paving
- Portuguese pavement
- Public space
- Road surface
- Sidewalk chalk
- Street furniture
