= Personal injury =

Legal term for an injury to a person

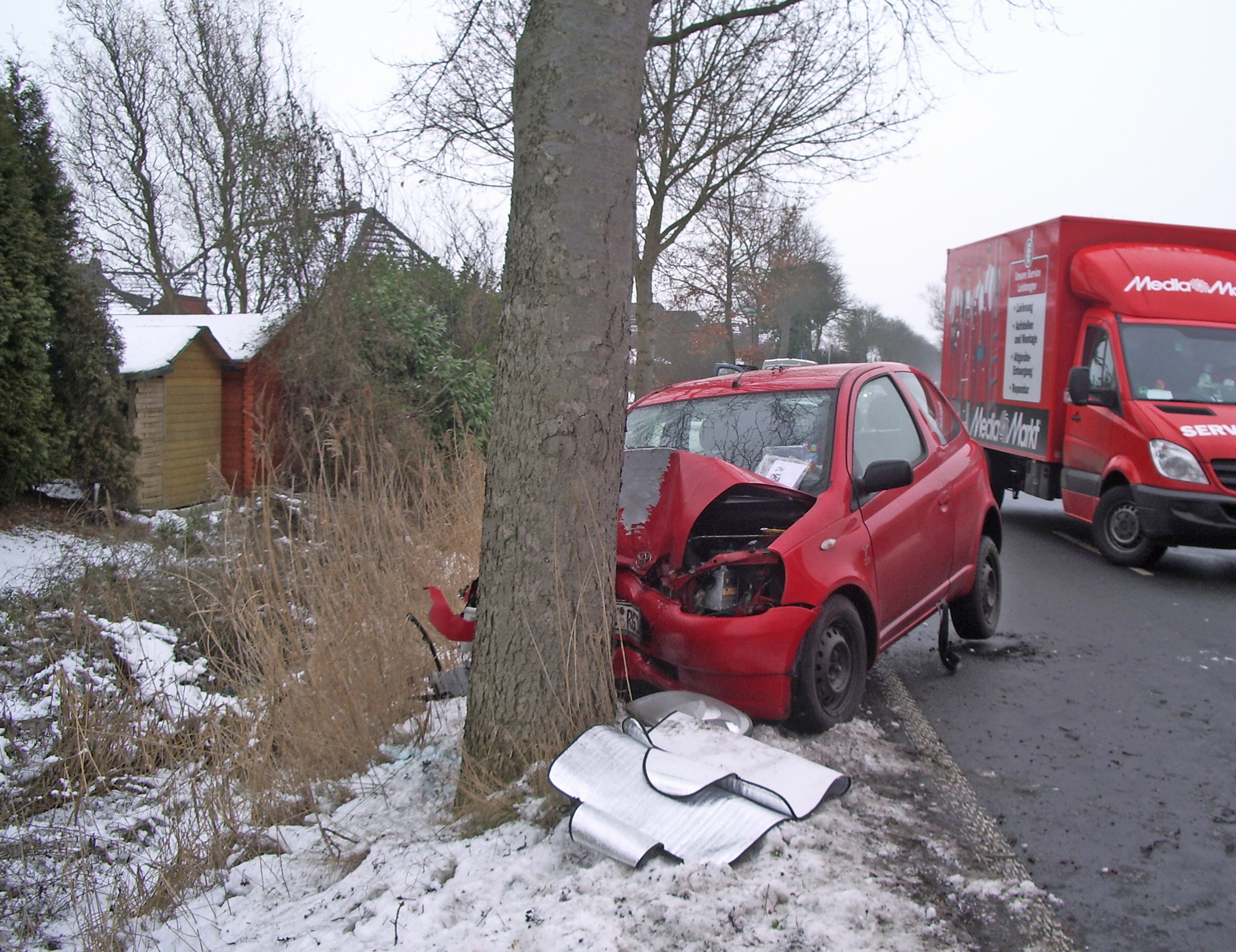
Car collisions are a major cause of personal injury cases.

Personal injury is a legal term for an injury to the body, mind, or emotions, as opposed to an injury to property. In common law jurisdictions the term is most commonly used to refer to a type of tort lawsuit in which the person bringing the suit (the plaintiff in American jurisdictions or claimant in English law) has suffered harm to their body or mind. Personal injury lawsuits are filed against the person or entity that caused the harm through negligence, gross negligence, reckless conduct, or intentional misconduct, and in some cases on the basis of strict liability. Different jurisdictions describe the damages (or, the things for which the injured person may be compensated) in different ways, but damages typically include the injured person's medical bills, pain and suffering, and diminished quality of life.

== History ==
Historically, personal injury lawsuits in tort for monetary damages were virtually nonexistent before the Industrial Revolution of the 19th century. In agrarian, pre-industrial societies where most people did not travel far from home during their lifetimes, accidental bodily injuries inflicted by one stranger upon another were quite rare. When a grievous accident did occur, the culprit was usually a relative or close friend, and part of the same small local community. Most persons were judgment proof before the rise of the middle class and the invention of modern liability insurance.

At common law, a victim of a personal injury and others with a direct interest in the outcome of an action (e.g., the victim's spouse) were automatically disqualified from testifying about the injury or its consequences (because the victim's self-interest in recovery was seen as inevitably resulting in an unacceptably high risk of perjury). Finally, pre-industrial injuries lacked the sheer magnitude of force of modern personal injuries, because they were normally inflicted by humans or animals, not powerful machines.

Injury victims were not necessarily left with no remedies at all; in some respects, criminal justice back then was much more expansive than its modern counterpart. For example, if an animal inflicted a personal injury, the animal itself could be the subject of criminal prosecution.

Another obstacle was that if an injury was severe enough to kill the victim, the common law followed the maxim actio personalis moritur cum persona. This literally meant that the cause of action died with the victim. It was not until the 19th century that legislatures throughout the common law world began to remedy this grave injustice by enacting statutes (e.g., the Fatal Accidents Act 1846) allowing for post-death wrongful death claims. Similarly, from the 1840s to the 1890s, legislatures throughout the common law world began to also enact statutes overturning the witness disqualification rule (after which victims could directly testify to how they had been injured and had subsequently suffered).

On top of all these barriers, most admissions of fault made by an employee of the defendant were inadmissible under the hearsay rule unless they could come in under the narrow res gestae exception for admissions of fault that were contemporaneously made with the negligent act. The modern hearsay exception for party admissions had not yet been invented.

In common law jurisdictions before the 1850s, an injury had to fit into a very small category in order to serve as the basis of a legal action worth pursuing to a final verdict: the injury was serious enough to justify legal action, but not so severe as to kill the victim; the injury, its cause, and its consequences had all been witnessed by entirely disinterested third parties; the defendant was a stranger to the plaintiff, but one with recoverable money or assets within the boundaries of the jurisdiction; and the plaintiff was able to find competent counsel willing and able to pursue such a rare kind of legal action. Such cases were not primarily motivated by the victim's interest in seeking compensation for their own pain and suffering, but were brought based on economic injury to someone "who possessed rights in the life and services of an immediate victim." In other words, in the eighteenth century, "American and English personal injury cases appear to have been concerned primarily with actions for loss of services—namely, damages to a master resulting from injury to members of the master’s household."

Starting in the middle of the 19th century, personal injury lawsuits were filed after accidents on the new railroads. Edward Watkin of the South Eastern Railway (England) complained in 1881 that

The result of this compensating law under which the slightest neglect makes the company liable, and the only thing to be considered is the amount of damages—the effect of this unjust law is to create a new profession compounded of the worst elements of the present professions—viz., expert doctors, expert attorneys, and expert witnesses. You will get a doctor to swear that a man who has a slight knock on the head to say that he has a diseased spine, and will never be fit for anything again, and never be capable of being a man of business or the father of a family. The result of that is all we can do is to get some other expert to say exactly the contrary.

The personal injury lawsuit evolved from a rare sight to a commonplace occurrence during the Second Industrial Revolution at the end of the 19th century. For example, in 1870, tort lawsuits made up only 4.2 percent of the contested caseload of New York City trial courts, but by 1910, that number had skyrocketed to 40.9 percent. In 1880, there were only about a dozen horsecar personal injury lawsuits currently pending in Boston; by 1910, "there were over 800 personal injury cases involving streetcars in superior court, and 600 more in the municipal court".

== Types ==
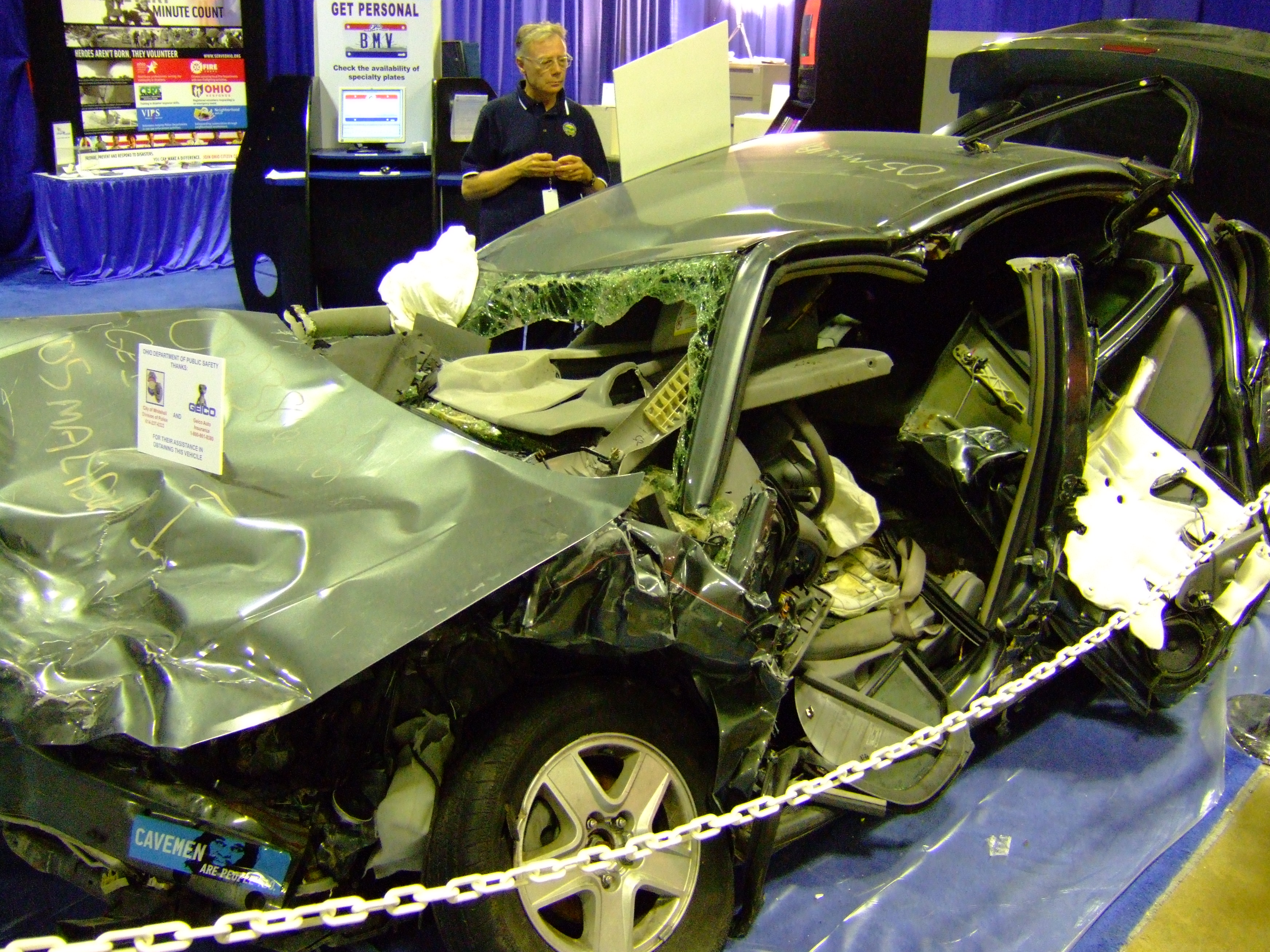
A Chevrolet Malibu involved in a rollover crash

Common types of personal injury claims include road traffic accidents, work accidents, tripping accidents, assault claims, and product defect accidents (product liability). The term personal injury also incorporates injuries arising from medical and dental care, that which may lead to medical negligence claims). Other causes of personal injury claims, include conditions that are often classified as occupational diseases. Personal injury cases may also include toxic torts, in which a contaminant transmitted by air or water causes illness, injury, or death. Other tort claims may be pursued in conjunction with personal injury claims.

The most common personal injury claim involves injury from a motor vehicle accident.

== Claims and payments ==
Depending upon the intent or negligence of a responsible party, the injured party may be entitled to monetary compensation from that party through a settlement or a judgment.

Although personal injury cases may result from an intentional act, such as defamation, or from reckless conduct, most personal injury claims are based on a theory of negligence. To hold a party or parties legally liable for injuries so damages based upon negligence, four elements must be proved:

1. Party A had a duty to act reasonably according to the circumstances.
2. Party A breached the duty.
3. Party A's breach of the duty caused party B to be harmed.
4. Party B suffered monetary damages due to the harm suffered when party A breached its duty of care.

The amount of compensation for a personal injury will primarily depend on the severity of the injury. Serious injuries (such as severed limbs or brain damage) that cause intense physical pain and suffering receive the highest injury settlements.

=== Lawsuits ===
As occurs in most civil cases, personal injury cases begin by filing with a court a document called a "complaint." Typically, a complaint in a personal injury case identifies the parties to the lawsuit, specifies what the defendant did wrong, alleges that the wrongdoing caused the plaintiff's injury, and specifies what kind of compensation the plaintiff is seeking. The complaint generally sets out the facts that the plaintiff will attempt to prove, and the defendant may attempt to disprove, throughout the litigation.

In most countries, payments will be through a settlement agreement or a judgment as a result of a trial. Settlements can be either lump-sum or as a structured settlement in which the payments are made over a period of time.

In some countries, those prevailing in trial may recover their attorneys' fees from the opposing party. In the United States, a party may be able to seek sanctions when the other party acts without legal basis or justifiable cause. For example, if the opposing party continues to object to the complaint without significant reason or justifiable cause, a party may apply a motion for punitive damages or that the opposing party is harassing and or speculating without merit or reason. The American Bar Association's Model Rules of Professional Conduct proposes that lawyers should be prohibited from bringing – or defending – a lawsuit "unless there is a basis in law and fact for doing so that is not frivolous."

=== Legal fees ===
The manner in which attorneys are compensated for representing injured plaintiffs varies by jurisdiction. For example, in the United States, attorneys often represent clients on a "contingent fee basis" in which the attorney's fee is a percentage of the plaintiff's eventual compensation, payable when the case is resolved, with no payment necessary if the case is unsuccessful. Depending upon state regulations, a plaintiff's attorney may charge 1/3 of the proceeds recovered if a case is settled out of court or 40 percent if the matter must be litigated. Attorney fees are negotiable before hiring an attorney.

Although some jurisdictions have historically helped people obtain affordable legal representation, those systems have typically been narrowed and may exclude personal injury cases. For example, in England legal aid from the government was largely abolished in the late 1990s and replaced with arrangements whereby the client would be charged no fee if her or his case was unsuccessful.

=== Time limitation ===
Many jurisdictions have statutes of limitations that determine how much time an individual has to file a claim. If a lawsuit is not filed in a timely manner the statute of limitations provides a defense that can allow the defendant to have the case dismissed with no compensation to the plaintiff.

In England and Wales, under the limitation rules, where an individual is bringing a claim for compensation, court proceedings must be commenced within 3 years of the date of the accident, failing which the claimant will lose the right to bring their claim. However, injured parties who were under the age of 18 at the time of their accidents have until the day prior to their 21st birthdays to commence proceedings. A court has the discretion to extend or waive the limitation period if it is considered equitable to do so. Another exception is if the accident caused an injury, as an example industrial deafness, then the three-year period will start from when injured party knew or ought to have known that he or she had a claim.

In the United States, each state has different statutes of limitation, and within a state different types of injuries may have different statutes of limitation. Rape claims, for example, often have a much longer statute of limitation than other injuries. In some states such as Colorado, the statute of limitations starts to run once the injury is discovered. For example, for an individual who begins experiencing severe back problems six months after a car accident, the statute would start when the back problems began.

In India, in case of motor vehicle accidents there is no time limitation for bringing a claim for compensation.

== Damages ==
Damages are categorized as either special or general. In torts, special damages are measurable costs which can be itemized such as medical expenses, lost earnings, and property damages whereas general damages include less measurable costs such as pain and suffering, loss of consortium, the effects of defamation, and emotional distress. Personal injury torts may result in claims for both special and general damages.

Aside from compensation for injuries, the injured person may get compensated for the lifetime effect of the injuries. An example, a keen cricketer suffers a wrist injury which prevents him from playing cricket during the cricket season. This is called loss of enjoyment of life and is compensable. Additionally, lost earning capacity (Future ability to learn) and future reasonably necessary medical expenses are recoverable.

In some cases, the injured might run their own businesses. The quantum assessment of the loss of profits (dividing into pre-trial and post-trial) requires forensic accounting expertise because the forensic accountant would consider various scenarios and adopt the best estimate based on the available objective data.

In the United Kingdom, the Damages Act 1996 gives the Lord Chancellor the ability to set a discount rate which courts must consider when awarding compensation for future financial losses in personal injury cases, reflecting the expectation that a lump sum compensation payment will attract investment interest. In 2001 this rate was set at 2.5%. In 2017, Liz Truss, then Lord Chancellor, reduced the rate to minus 0.75%, because three year average of real yields on index-linked gilts had fallen since 2001 and because of her legal duty to treat people in receipt of injury compensation awards as "risk-averse investors". In July 2019 the rate in England and Wales was increased to minus 0.25% following "extensive review" and in the light of concerns that "claimants were being substantially over-compensated" through use of the minus 0.75% rate. The insurance industry has recorded concerns that the rate is still too low, adding to insurance costs and leaving England and Wales as "an international outlier" when compared with other jurisdictions. The discount rate in Northern Ireland is minus 1.5%.

== No-fault compensation fund ==
Some jurisdictions offer no-fault compensation systems for personal injury cases, or types of personal injury cases, whereby an injured person can recover compensation from a fund or insurance program without regard to who is at fault for the person's injury. For example, in the United States, most injuries that occur while the injured person is working for an employer are compensated through a no-fault workers' compensation system. In New Zealand, the Accident Compensation Corporation provides no-fault compensation to all accident victims (including medical malpractice), and personal injury lawsuits are rare (except in cases of reckless conduct). Proponents of this system say that it results in faster, fairer awards to victims. Opponents argue that it can lead to moral hazards by encouraging people to engage in behavior they would otherwise avoid for fear of legal liability, such as putting out a trampoline for neighborhood children to use.

== United States ==
Personal injury cases represent the most common type of lawsuits filed in United States federal district courts, representing 25.5 percent of cases filed in 2015. Personal injury claims represent a considerably smaller percentage of cases filed in state courts. For example, in Illinois, tort claims represent approximately 7% of the civil docket.

=== Insurance ===
In the United States, personal injury in the sense of "bodily injury" to others is often covered by liability insurance. Most businesses carry commercial general liability policies. Different states have different rules regarding auto insurance, but generally, a driver's liability insurance is available to compensate others whom that driver may inadvertently injure, and uninsured or underinsured motorist coverage is available to compensate the driver for injuries inflicted upon the driver by someone else. Therefore, an insurance company will provide a legal defense to the defendant and may settle with the plaintiff (victim).

Additional damages for mental injury without a physical injury are less clearly covered, as the insurance policy typically states that it covers only bodily injury. For example, for the purposes of general liability, a 2001 survey found that a minority of courts included emotional distress within the definition of bodily injury. Where a mental injury arises from a physical injury—as with a traumatic brain injury caused by a car accident—auto insurance policies normally cover the injury.

In insurance, "personal injury," as typically defined, does not include mental injury that occurs as a result of defamation, false arrest or imprisonment, or malicious prosecution. For example, the Insurance Services Office standard general liability form has a section providing this coverage. Some home insurance policies include personal injury coverage.

Despite the general distinction between bodily injury and personal injury in insurance contracts, auto insurance known as personal injury protection (PIP) does cover medical expenses from bodily injury. This type of insurance is available in some states, but not others.

In the U.S., twelve states and the territory of Puerto Rico have no-fault auto insurance systems, which provide financial support to those injured in car accidents. Although the benefits will vary depending on the state, no-fault benefits will generally: (1) pay for an injured person's car crash-related medical bills and lost wages; (2) be paid by the injured person's own insurance company; and (3) be paid regardless of whether the injured person was at-fault for the crash. In Michigan, the Michigan Catastrophic Claims Association has historically helped catastrophically injured crash victims.

=== Taxation ===
In the United States, for federal taxes payable to the IRS, the money awarded in a personal injury settlement as compensation for pain and suffering, medical expenses and property damage is not ordinarily taxable. Exceptions may apply, for example, if a plaintiff took a tax deduction in a prior year for medical expenses that are recovered through a later judgment or settlement.

Compensation for lost wages or lost business profits will typically be taxed.

=== State laws ===
In California, attorneys typically receive contingency fees of 35% of the total recovery obtained before a lawsuit is filed, and 45% if the recovery occurs after filing the complaint. In some types of cases, the judge handling the case may determine the total percentage of the settlement or the payment to the attorneys. Treating doctors or health care profession and/or insurance companies, Med-Cal, or other program paying for medical treatment may assert a lien against any recovery for what was paid to treat the plaintiff. These liens are paid once a settlement is reached or a judgment is received.

In California, according to California Code of Civil Procedure Section 335, the statute of limitations in California is 2 years from the date of loss. A date of loss refers to the date in which the accident has happened. Minors in California who are filing a claim against an entity or person has until 2 years after their 18th birthdays to satisfy the statute of limitations. For governmental claims, both minors and adults have 6 months to file a claim with its corresponding jurisdiction according to Government Code section 911.2. After filing a claim to satisfy Government Code Section 911.2, the claimant has an additional 6 months to file a lawsuit against a government entity unless the entity accepts the claim.

For wrongful death cases in California, people qualify to claim damages if they are the following: (1) the deceased person's surviving spouse; (2) the deceased person's domestic partner; (3) the deceased person's surviving children; or (3) if there is no surviving person in the deceased person's line of descent, then a wrongful death lawsuit may be brought by anyone "who would be entitled to the property of the decedent by intestate succession," which can include the deceased person's parents, or the deceased person's siblings, depending on who is living at the time of the deceased person's death. (California Code of Civil Procedure section 337.60). Otherwise a plaintiff will have to prove that financially dependency on the deceased person.

For automobile accidents in California, a plaintiff must show proof of financial responsibility (California Vehicle Code sections 16000-16078) to claim economical and non-economical damages. Proving the minimum financial responsibility means that a person must be insured by the state's minimum coverage of insurance, which in some cases may be referred to "limited liability" type of insurance. If the plaintiff cannot prove financial responsibility, the plaintiff may be unable to obtain non-economic damages unless his claim falls into certain exceptions, including if the defendant is convicted of driving under the influence, the accident did not arise from the use of an automobile, or his claim is for product liability.

== United Kingdom ==
Personal injury claims are awarded via civil action for torts like in the United States. The book Guidelines for the Assessment of General Damages in Personal Injury Cases, produced by the Judicial College, is influential in determining how much money is awarded by courts.

== See also ==
- Association of Personal Injury Lawyers
- Personal injury lawyer
- Big Apple Pothole and Sidewalk Protection Committee
- Pain and suffering
