= Big Apple Pothole and Sidewalk Protection Committee =

Sidewalk safety group in New York

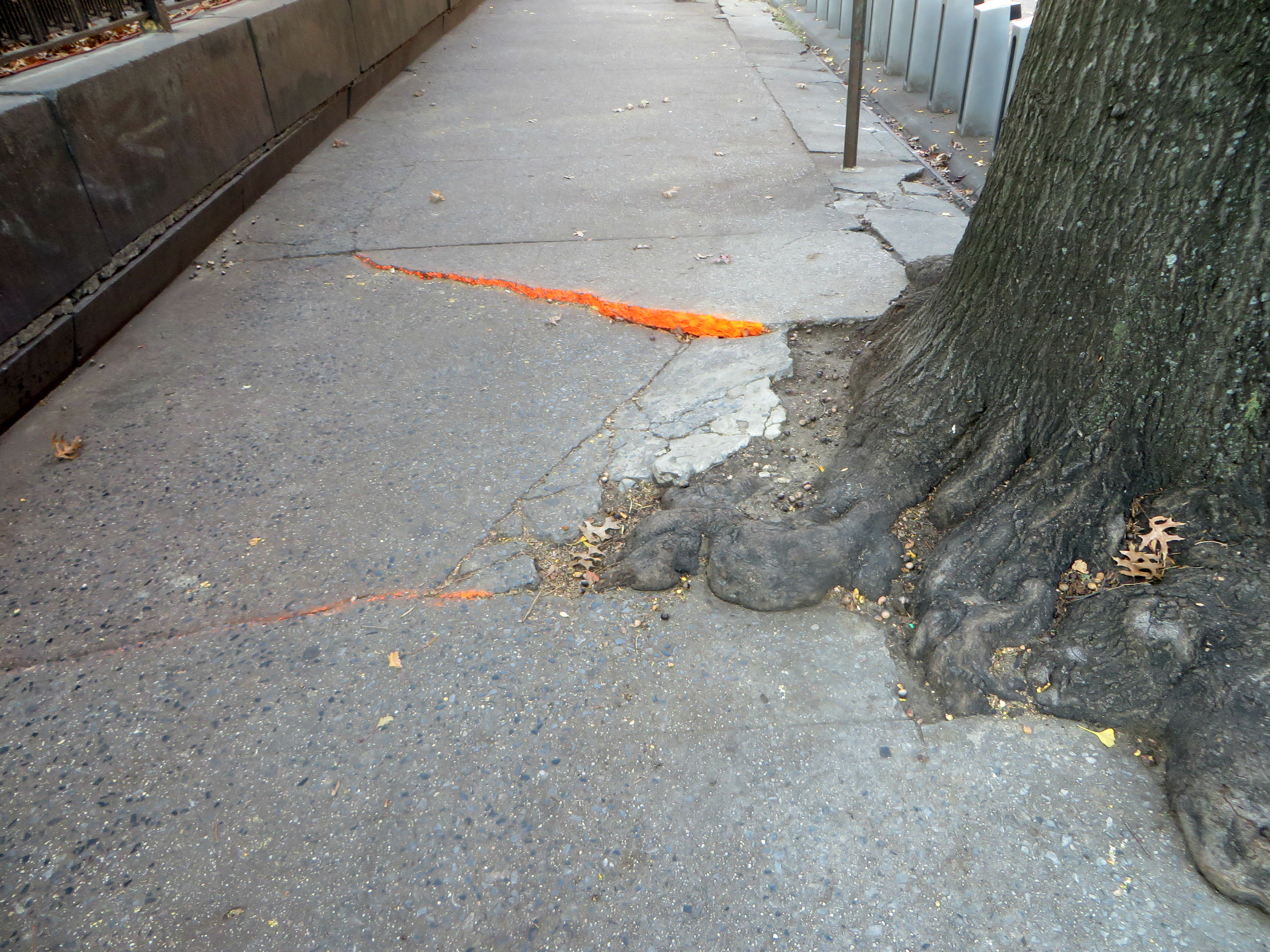
A cracked sidewalk on 11th Street in Manhattan

The Big Apple Pothole and Sidewalk Protection Committee is an organization created by the New York State Trial Lawyers Association to map the sidewalks of New York City for defects capable of causing personal injury. The maps produced by the Committee and delivered to the Department of Transportation essentially negated the effect of a 1979 change to the city's Administrative Code that barred tort actions against the city unless the city was notified of the defects more than 15 days prior to the accident.

The city paid out hundreds of millions of dollars in civil judgments over the next two decades before a 2003 law shifted liability to adjacent property owners. The Committee ceased producing maps after the new law, and the use of the maps in injuries predating the change was substantially limited by a 2008 decision of New York's highest court.

== The Code ==
New York City Administrative Code § 7-201(c)(2), passed in 1979 by the New York City council and codified in 1980, bars personal injury lawsuits against the city arising from sidewalk or roadway defects, unless the city was notified of the defect at least 15 days prior to the injury. The administrative code (as amended in 2006) provides:

No civil action shall be maintained against the city for damage to property or injury to person or death sustained in consequence of any street, highway, bridge, wharf, culvert, sidewalk or crosswalk, or any part or portion of any of the foregoing including any encumbrances thereon or attachments thereto, being out of repair, unsafe, dangerous or obstructed, unless it appears that written notice of the defective, unsafe, dangerous or obstructed condition, was actually given to the commissioner of transportation or any person or department authorized by the commissioner to receive such notice, or where there was previous injury to person or property as a result of the existence of the defective, unsafe, dangerous or obstructed condition, and written notice thereof was given to a city agency, or there was written acknowledgement from the city of the defective, unsafe, dangerous or obstructed condition, and there was a failure or neglect within fifteen days after the receipt of such notice to repair or remove the defect, danger or obstruction complained of, or the place otherwise made reasonably safe.

== The survey ==
The organization was created in 1982. The "Big Apple" in its name is a reference to the nickname for New York City. The committee's maps were prepared annually and submitted to the city's Department of Transportation. The Transportation department initially refused to accept the maps, but was forced to do so by a court order. The city's appeal was denied without opinion.

The organization produced an average of 5,000 maps per year, covering all five boroughs and 13,000 miles of sidewalk, and noting more than 700,000 sidewalk hazards. Viewing most of the defects as minor or non-existent, the city began filing the maps away unread, in an attempt to argue in court that the unread maps did not provide "meaningful notice". A 2002 report by Michael Cardozo, a lawyer for the city's corporation states that "Relying on maps that provide hundreds of thousands of squiggles, but no meaningful information about sidewalk defects, plaintiffs have been able to sue the city successfully for even the most trivial sidewalk imperfections."

== Use in court ==
In some cases, courts held that both the current map and earlier maps could be and were admissible in trial as proof of negligence. In other cases, the city was granted a directed verdict when the plaintiff's claim was based on a defect noted in a prior map but not in the most recent. In contrast, in cases where the sidewalk defect was absent from the maps, cases have been dismissed by summary judgment. Any ambiguity arising from the symbols on the map has (until 2008) generally been a question for the jury.

There were 2,729 sidewalk injury suits against the city in 2006 (resulting in $55.5 million in recovery), compared to 3,482 in 2003 ($68 million). Recoveries between 1997 and 2006 totaled $600 million. Sidewalk injuries are the most common cause of lawsuits against the city.

== Since 2003 ==
A 2003 law shifted the liability from the city to the adjacent property owners, substantially decreasing the number of suits filed. The 2003 law applies only to sidewalks; the city remains liable for hazards in streets. The production of maps ceased after the new 2003 law, but—as of 2009—there are still thousands of cases utilizing the maps from injuries predating the law.

A December 18, 2008 ruling by the New York Court of Appeals, D'Onofrio v. City of New York, significantly lessened the liability the city faces as a result of the maps. A 5-2 decision against the combined cases of two plaintiffs written by Judge Robert S. Smith found that the photographic evidence conflicted with the map in one case and that the map symbols were too illegible in the other. The ruling held that for the city to be liable, the marking on the map must match the actual conditions (e.g., the city would not be liable for a hole if the map denoted a crack). D'Onofrio substantially decreased the number of cases that would reach a jury:

Plaintiffs in Shaperonovitch argue that the symbol on the map is "ambiguous" and that its interpretation is for the jury. We disagree; we do not see how a rational jury could find that this mark conveyed any information at all. Because the map did not give the City notice of the defect, the City was entitled to judgment as a matter of law."

Judge Theodore J. Jones, in his dissent, stated:

Mapping hazards is hardly an exact science. Although the symbols on the Big Apple maps were not designed to give notice of every unique defect found on the sidewalks and roads of New York City, each symbol on the map legend represents a general category of potentially hazardous defects (e.g., "Hole or hazardous depression," "Raised or uneven portion of sidewalk," "Pothole or other hazard"). Clearly, if no symbol or a completely different symbol is used on the map, the City does not receive notice of a given defect. It follows that where the defect could reasonably be encompassed by the symbol used on the map, the question of whether the City received notice of that defect is for the fact finder and not one that can be easily answered as a matter of law.

== Leadership and governance ==
- Stephan H. Peskin, Esq., President
- Andrea Kinloch, Assistant Director
