= Association of Personal Injury Lawyers =

- Established: (36 years ago)
- Purpose: Personal injury
- Coordinates: 52°56′16″N 1°10′07″W
- Membership: 3,000
- Website: www.apil.org.uk

The Association of Personal Injury Lawyers (APIL) is a United Kingdom not-for-profit organisation comprising approximately 3,000 personal injury solicitors, barristers, academics and students.

The association was founded in 1990 by a group of barristers and solicitors who wished to improve the services provided for victims of negligence. Its four founders are Rodger Pannone, Michael Napier CBE, John Melville Williams QC, and Simon Walton.

== Campaigns ==
Rebuilding Shattered Lives is APIL's flagship campaign that aims to address perceptions about compensation.

APIL holds regular meetings with Government ministers, MPs, civil servants and opinion formers on campaigns for reform in the law, including:

- Lobbying for full and fair compensation for victims of asbestos-related lung cancer.
- A campaign to reform the law on bereavement damages in England, Wales, and Northern Ireland.
- Support for survivors of childhood sexual abuse.
- Putting injured people at the heart of policymaking.

Information on APIL's campaigns can be found here.

== Accreditation ==
APIL runs an accreditation scheme which assesses personal injury lawyers according to their expertise and experience. Lawyers who gain this accreditation kitemark have at least five years' experience of handling personal injury claims, and are known as senior litigators, fellows or senior fellows, depending on the amount of experience they have.

All APIL members are bound to abide by a code of conduct.

== Structure ==
APIL is governed by members who stand for election annually. The current president is Matthew Tuff.
