= Pope-Hennessy =

Pope-Hennessy, or Pope Hennessy, a surname, may refer to:

- James Pope-Hennessy (1916-1974), writer
- John Pope Hennessy (1834-1891), governor of Hong Kong and later Mauritius
- John Wyndham Pope-Hennessy (1913–1994), art historian
- Una Pope-Hennessy (1875-1949), writer, mother of James and the younger John
- Richard Pope-Hennessy (1875-1942), British Army officer and husband of Una
