= John Pope-Hennessy =

British art historian

Sir John Pope-Hennessy CBE
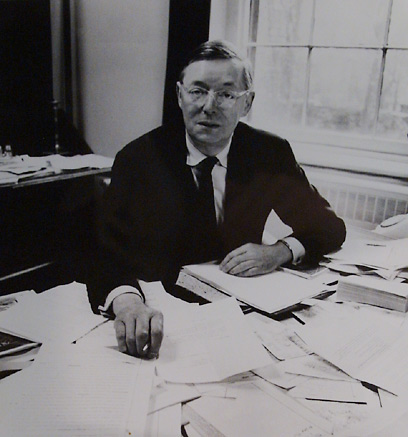
- Pope-Hennessy at his desk.
- Born: John Wyndham Pope-Hennessy; 13 December 1913; London, England
- Died: 31 October 1994 (aged 80); Florence, Italy
- Resting place: Cimitero degli Allori, Florence, Italy
- Education: Balliol College, Oxford
- Occupation: Art historian
- Parents: Richard Pope-Hennessy (father); Una Pope-Hennessy (mother)
- Relatives: Sir John Pope Hennessy (grandfather); James Pope-Hennessy (brother)

Sir John Wyndham Pope-Hennessy CBE FBA FSA (13 December 1913 – 31 October 1994), was a British art historian. Pope-Hennessy was director of the Victoria and Albert Museum between 1967 and 1973, director of the British Museum between 1974 and 1976, and subsequently led the department of European painting at the Metropolitan Museum of Art in New York until 1988. He was a scholar of Italian Renaissance art. Many of his writings, including the tripartite Introduction to Italian Sculpture, and his magnum opus, Donatello: Sculptor, are regarded as classics in the field.

== Early years ==
Born into an Irish Catholic family in the Belgravia district of Central London, Pope-Hennesssy's father was Major-General Richard Pope-Hennessy, who was the son of the politician Sir John Pope Hennessy. Pope-Hennessy's mother was Dame Una Pope-Hennessy. He was the elder of two sons; his younger brother, James Pope-Hennessy, was a noted writer.

Pope-Hennessy was educated at Downside School, a Catholic boarding school for boys, in Stratton-on-the-Fosse. He then went on to Balliol College, Oxford, where he specialised in modern history. At Oxford, he was introduced by Logan Pearsall Smith, a family friend, to Kenneth Clark, who later became a mentor.

Upon graduation, Pope-Hennessy embarked on his grand tour by travelling in continental Europe and becoming acquainted with art collections, both public and private.

During World War II he served as a Flight Lieutenant in the Deputy Directorate of Intelligence at the Air Ministry.

== Career ==
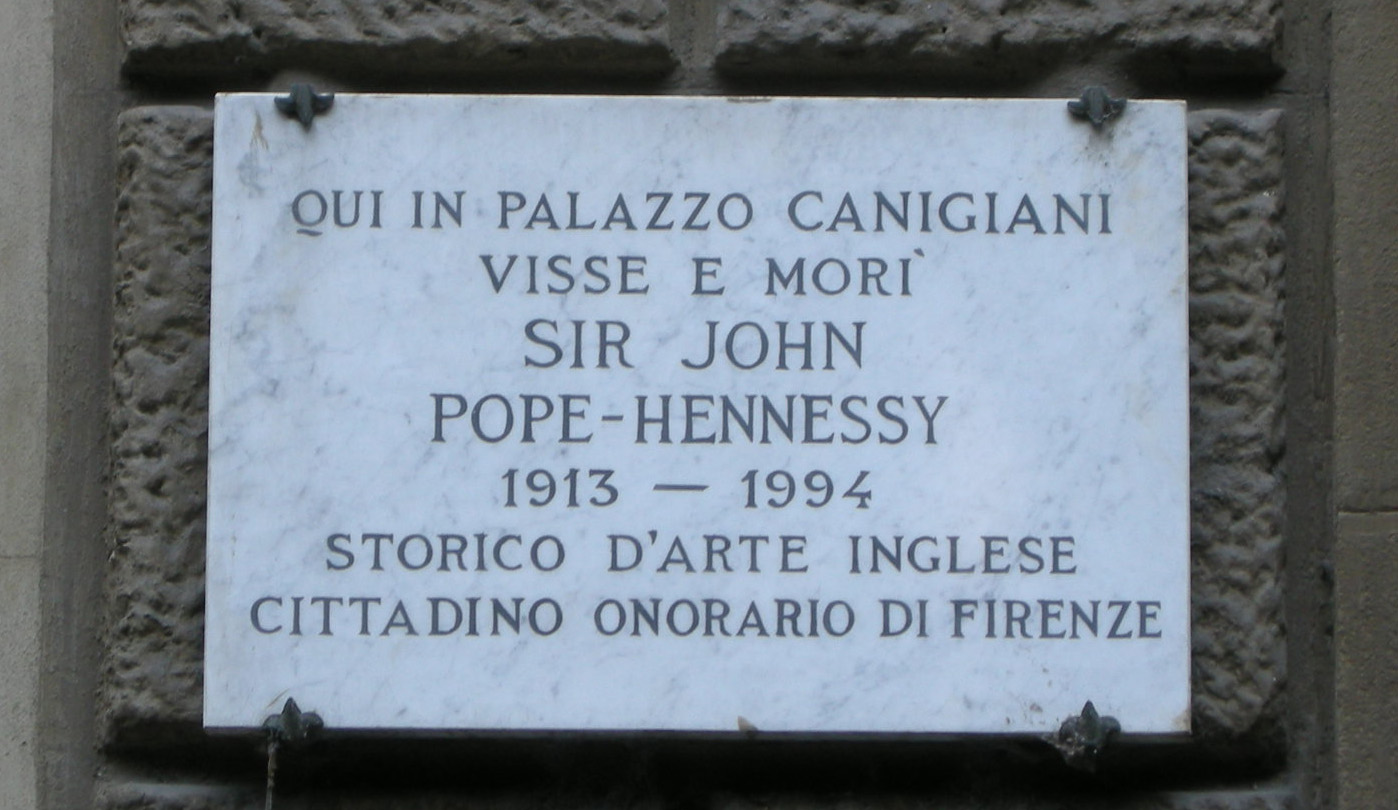
Commemorative plaque in honour of Pope-Hennessy affixed to Palazzo Canigiani, where he lived and died in Florence.

Between 1955 and 1963, Pope-Hennessy's three-volume Introduction to Italian Sculpture was published, covering Gothic, Renaissance and High Renaissance and Baroque sculpture. The following year, he was named Slade Professor of Fine Art at the University of Cambridge.

Pope-Hennessy served as the director of the Victoria and Albert Museum between 1967 and 1973, and then as director of the British Museum from 1974 until 1976. There, he was nicknamed by colleagues as "The Pope". He is the only person to have served as head of both museums. In November 1966 he was appointed as a member of the Italian Art and Archives Rescue Fund, formed in response to the Italian floods, and travelled to Florence to report on damage sustained to works of art. His report was published in the Financial Times.

Traumatised by the murder of his gay brother James in January 1974, Pope-Hennessy left Britain in 1976 for good. Initially, he went to Tuscany, but was enticed by an offer from the Metropolitan Museum of Art to head its department of European painting, and moved to New York City. He combined this curatorial post with a professorship at New York University's Institute of Fine Arts. Pope-Hennessy was elected to the American Philosophical Society in 1974 and the American Academy of Arts and Sciences in 1978. In 1986, Philippe de Montebello, director of the Metropolitan Museum of Art, created the John Pope-Hennessy Curatorship of European Paintings.

Pope-Hennessy also served on the boards of the Venice in Peril Fund and Save Venice Inc., two non-profit organisations dedicated to the conservation and preservation of Venetian cultural heritage.

Besides his own scholarly publications, some of which became classics and were often reprinted, and his responsibilities as a museum director, he provided his name and expertise for others (such as Sotheby's or the Collins Encyclopedia of Antiques). He also wrote a foreword for Helmut Gernsheim's photographies of Beautiful London, contributed to a book on Westminster Abbey (1972), and wrote an autobiography that was published in 1991.

== Death and legacy ==
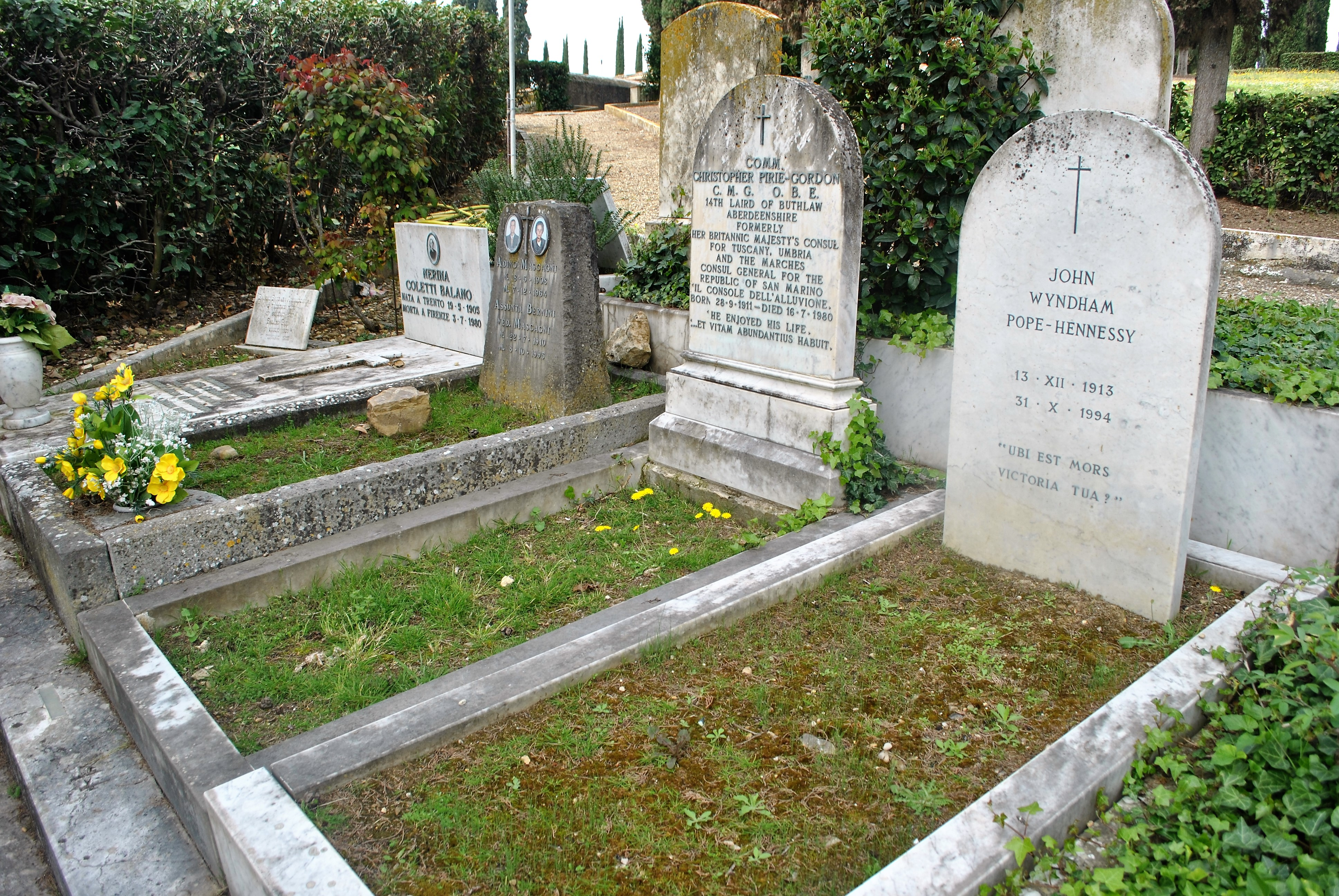
Pope-Hennessy's grave at the Cimitero degli Allori in Florence.

Although never really rich, Pope-Hennessy improved his financial situation substantially in the 1980s by selling two paintings he had acquired in 1946 in the sale of the Bridgewater House collection: Domenichino's Christ Carrying the Cross, which he had bought for GBP38, to the Getty Museum for USD750,000 and Annibale Carracci's Vision of Saint Francis, which he had bought for only GBP28, to the National Gallery of Canada for GBP100,000. With these proceeds he was able to afford his new lodging in Florence.

Hence, he retired at the age of seventy-five and moved permanently to Florence with his lover, Michael Mallon, and resided at Palazzo Canigiani, where he died five years later of complications from a liver ailment. After the funeral service at the small church of San Francesco Poverino in piazza Santissima Annunziata Pope-Hennessy was buried in the Cimitero degli Allori in Florence. His gravestone includes a quote from the First Epistle to the Corinthians in the Bible: ubi est mors victoria tua? ("Where is your victory, O death?"). The remains of his impressive art collection in Florence were sold two years after his death for roughly GBP1,000,000 at Christie's in New York.

== Bibliography ==
- Giovanni di Paolo, Chatto & Windus 1937
- Sassetta, Chatto & Windus 1939
- Sienese Quattrocento Painting, Phaidon 1947
- The Drawings of Domenichino in the Collection of His Majesty the King at Windsor Castle, Phaidon 1948
- A Lecture on Nicholas Hilliard, Home and Van Thal 1949
- The Life of Benvenuto Cellini. Written by Himself, introduced and illustrated by JPH, Phaidon 1949
- Uccello. The Complete Work of the Great Florentine Painter, Phaidon 1950
- Fra Angelico. Complete Edition, Phaidon 1952
- Piero Della Francesca, The Metropolitan Museum of Art Miniatures, 1954
- Introduction to Italian Sculpture (3 vols.), Phaidon 1955–1963, 3rd revised ed. 1996
  - Vol. I: Italian Gothic Sculpture, 1955
  - Vol. II: Italian Renaissance Scutpture, 1958
  - Vol. III: Italian High Renaissance and Baroque Sculpture, 1963
- The Portrait in the Renaissance, the A. W. Mellon Lectures in the Fine Arts, Phaidon 1963
- Renaissance Bronzes from the Samuel H. Kress Collection, Phaidon 1965
- Essays on Italian Sculpture, Phaidon 1968
- The Frick Collection. An Illustrated Catalogue, assisted by Anthony F. Radcliffe, Princeton Univ. Press 1970
  - Vol. III: Sculpture – Italian
  - Vol. IV: Sculpture – German, Netherlandish French and British
- Raphael, the Wrightsman Lectures, delivered under the Auspices of the New York University Institute of Fine Arts, Harper & Row 1970
- The Study and Criticism of Italian Sculpture, Metropolitan Museum of Art/Princeton Univ. Press 1980
- Luca Della Robbia, Cornell Univ. Press 1980
- Cellini, photography by David Finn, Takashi Okamura a.o., Abbeville 1985
- Donatello, photography by Liberto Perugi, critical apparatus by Giovanna Ragionieri, Cantini (Florence) 1985 (Italian)
- Learning to Look. An Autobiography, Heinemann 1991
- The Piero Della Francesca Trail, Twenty-Third Walter Neurath Memorial Lecture, Thames & Hudson 1991
- Andrea Mantegna, photography by David Finn, Olivetti/Electa 1992
- Paradiso: The Illuminations to Dante's Divine Comedy by Giovanni di Paolo, Random House 1993
- Donatello: Sculptor, Abbeville 1993

Victoria and Albert Museum publications

As the museum's director he wrote the foreword for several exhibition catalogues –Musical Instruments as Works of Art (1968), Berlioz and the Romantic Imagination, English Watches, Fine Illustrations in Western European Printed Books and The Fashionable Lady in the 19th Century (all in 1969), Charles Dickens (1970), Kokoschka: Prints and Drawings (1971), Fashion. An Anthology selected by Cecil Beaton and Madeleine Ginsburg (1971, which set a new standard in fashion exhibitions and enriched the museum's dress collection), Designs from the Cooper-Hewitt Collection, New York (1973), a. o. He also introduced the museum's first Yearbook in 1969. But even long before his tenure as director he already had catalogued the museum's collection of Italian sculpture, published in three volumes in 1964, as well as wrote the texts and was responsible for the following publications (published by Her Majesty's Stationery Office (HMSO)).

- Victoria and Albert Museum Monographs
  - No. 1: Donatello's Relief of the Ascension with Christ Giving the Keys to St. Peter, HMSO 1949
  - No. 2: The Virgin with the Laughing Child, HMSO 1949
  - No. 5: Italian Gothic Sculpture in the Victoria & Albert Museum, HMSO 1952
  - No. 6: The Virgin and Child by Agostino di Duccio, HMSO 1952
  - No. : Samson and a Philistine by Giovanni Bologna, HMSO 1954
- The Raphael Cartoons (foreword), HMSO 1950
- Catalogue of Italian Sculpture in the Victoria and Albert Museum (3 vols.), HMSO 1964
- An Ivory by Giovanni Pisano, Museum Bulletin, Vol. I, No. 3, July 1965 (Text reprinted separately as brochure in 1971)

Metropolitan Museum of Art catalogues

- Secular Painting in 15th-Century Tuscany: Birth Trays, Cassone Panels, and Portraits, co-ed. with Keith Christiansen, 1980
- France in the Golden Age: Seventeenth-Century French Paintings in American Collections, with Pierre Rosenberg, Grand Palais, Paris, 1982
- The Jack and Belle Linsky Collection in The Metropolitan Museum of Art, 1984
- Italian Paintings in the Robert Lehman Collection, 1986
- "Giovanni di Paolo", Museum Bulletin, Vol. XLVI, Nr. 2, 1988

The Metropolitan Museum also published John Pope-Hennessy: A Bibliography in 1986, compiled by Everett Fahy

Posthumous compilations

- On Artists and Art Historians: Selected Book Reviews by John Pope-Hennessy, Villa I Tatti: The Harvard Univ. Center for Italian Renaissance Studies, 12, edited by Walter Kaiser and Michael Mallon, L. S. Olschki (Florence) 1993
- Italian Art 1200–1800 from the Libraries of Sir John Pope-Hennessy & Rudolf Wittkower with Some Additions, Catalogue No. 188 (listed are 1214 monographs plus 938 general books), Ursus Books 1996

== See also ==
- List of directors of the British Museum

Academic offices
Preceded by Ellis Waterhouse	Slade Professor of Fine Art, Oxford University; 1956	Succeeded by Douglas Cooper
Preceded by Michael Levey	Slade Professor of Fine Art, Cambridge University; 1964	Succeeded by Sir Anthony Blunt
