= Martin Battersby =

British painter

George Martin Battersby (12 February 1914 – 3 April 1982) was a British trompe-l'œil and Mural artist, theatrical costume designer and set decorator, and a collector and connoisseur of the decorative arts who became an expert on Art Nouveau and the style of the 1920s and 1930s.

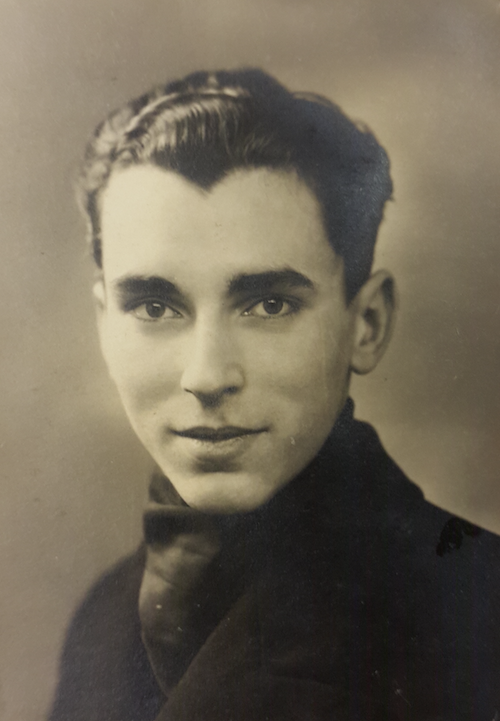
Martin Battersby, c. 1928, aged 14 and the time he began work at Gill & Reigate

== Early life ==
Battersby was born in North London to Jessie Elizabeth Battersby (nee Tunbridge) (1888 - 1980) and George Albert Battersby (1886 - 1963). Battersby's parents were married at the prestigious Anglican church St George's, Hanover Square, London, on 29th July 1913, seven months' before Battersby was born. His parents never lived together. Battersby was brought up in an all-female household; his mother, his grandmother Sophia Tunbridge (nee Martin) and his aunt Phyllis. They lived together in Kilburn and later Golders Green.

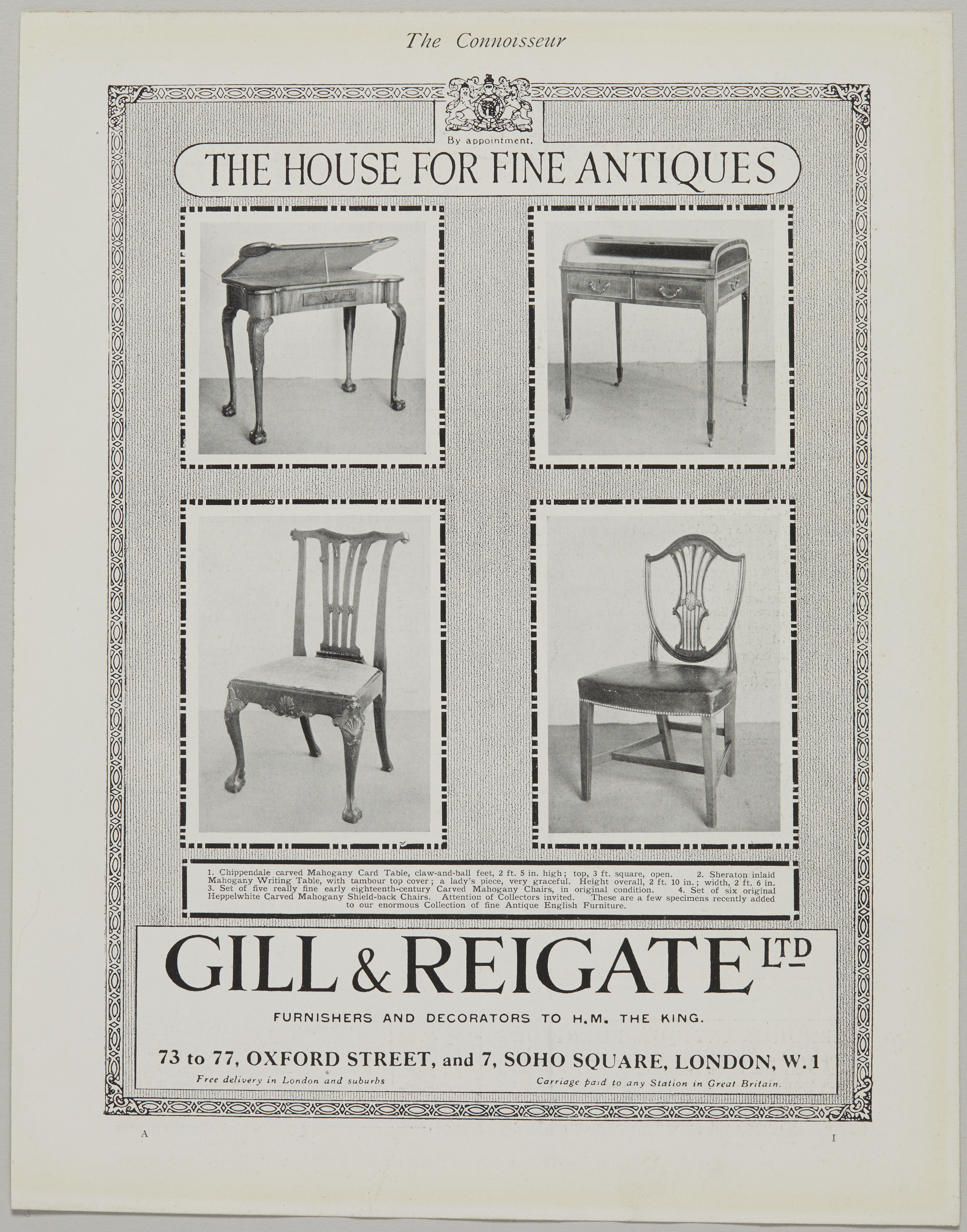
Advertisement for Gill & Reigate, The Connoisseur magazine, 1912

== Early Career 1928 - 1935 ==
His father worked in the family business as a pawnbroker in North London but Martin was drawn to the visual arts from a young age. Battersby never attended university or art school, instead entering work at the age of 14. He trained as a draughtsman at the interior design company Gill & Reigate, beginning in 1928, remaining there for five years. He claimed that this was the only formal training he ever received in life. As a draughtsman he learnt the history of design and the decorative arts from the seventeenth to the nineteenth centuries. He also learnt the discipline of drawing inanimate objects. This knowledge and skills Battersby would employ with great dexterity in his future careers as an artist and muralist.

With the Depression of the late 1930s Battersby either left or was let go by Gill & Reigate. Working briefly at the London department store Liberty's he then embarked on a career as an actor, studying for four terms from 1934 to 1935 at the London drama school the Royal Academy of Dramatic Art (RADA). In 1936 Battersby worked for a year as an actor in rep. theatre, touring England in a number of plays. The most significant of these plays was Death Takes a Holiday where he played opposite the South African actor Edana Romney.

== The Theatre 1936 - 1950 ==
His stage career was eclipsed by an interest in set design and painting and he worked for a year on the stage productions of the theatre impresario Emile Littler. In 1937 Battersby created the decor for the Littler production Floodlights, a revue starring the American actor Frances Day and British comedy actor George Lacy. Floodlights was staged at Battersby's local theatre the Golders Green Hippodrome.

The following year Battersby was commissioned to create the sets for the Old Vic production of Hamlet with Laurence Olivier in the lead role. This was to be the first of two experiences for Battersby of working with Olivier.

It was in this period that Battersby was introduced to the wealthy art collector and later gallery owner Arthur Jeffress. Jeffress introduced Battersby to the London art world and he was one of the first to commission a mural from Battersby. Battersby created a decorative scheme for the bedroom of Jeffress home Marwell Lodge in Owslebury, Hampshire. Jeffress would go on to hold numerous exhibitions of Battersby paintings at his galleries in the 1950s and 1960s.

This was followed by commissions for the Royal Shakespeare Company at Stratford. A 1956 profile in The Sketch has a page portrait by Hans Wild. The writer states: "Battersby assured me that he has never in his life attended an art school, or even had any art lessons. He is entirely self-taught."

== Cecil Beaton 1945 - 1950 ==
Battersby continued to expand his experience by working in the antiques trade and buying for his own eclectic collection. In the 1940s he worked as assistant to Cecil Beaton. He began in 1945 on Beaton's production of Lady Windermere's Fan. It was as Beaton's assistant that he worked for the second time with Olivier. Beaton's production of Richard Brinsley Sheridan play The School for Scandal starred Olivier and Vivien Leigh in the title roles. Leigh's dislike of some elements of Beaton's costumes designs caused tensions between Leigh and Battersby and in 1948 Battersby was forced to resign from the production. Beaton fell out with Olivier and Leigh over the 'Scandal saga' (as Battersby called it) and they were never to talk again.

Battersby work on Beaton's The Gainsborough Girls brought its own problems in production. Battersby resigned as Beaton's assistant from the production on the eve of its premier at the Theatre Royal in Brighton in 1950. Battersby and Beaton were to never speak again.

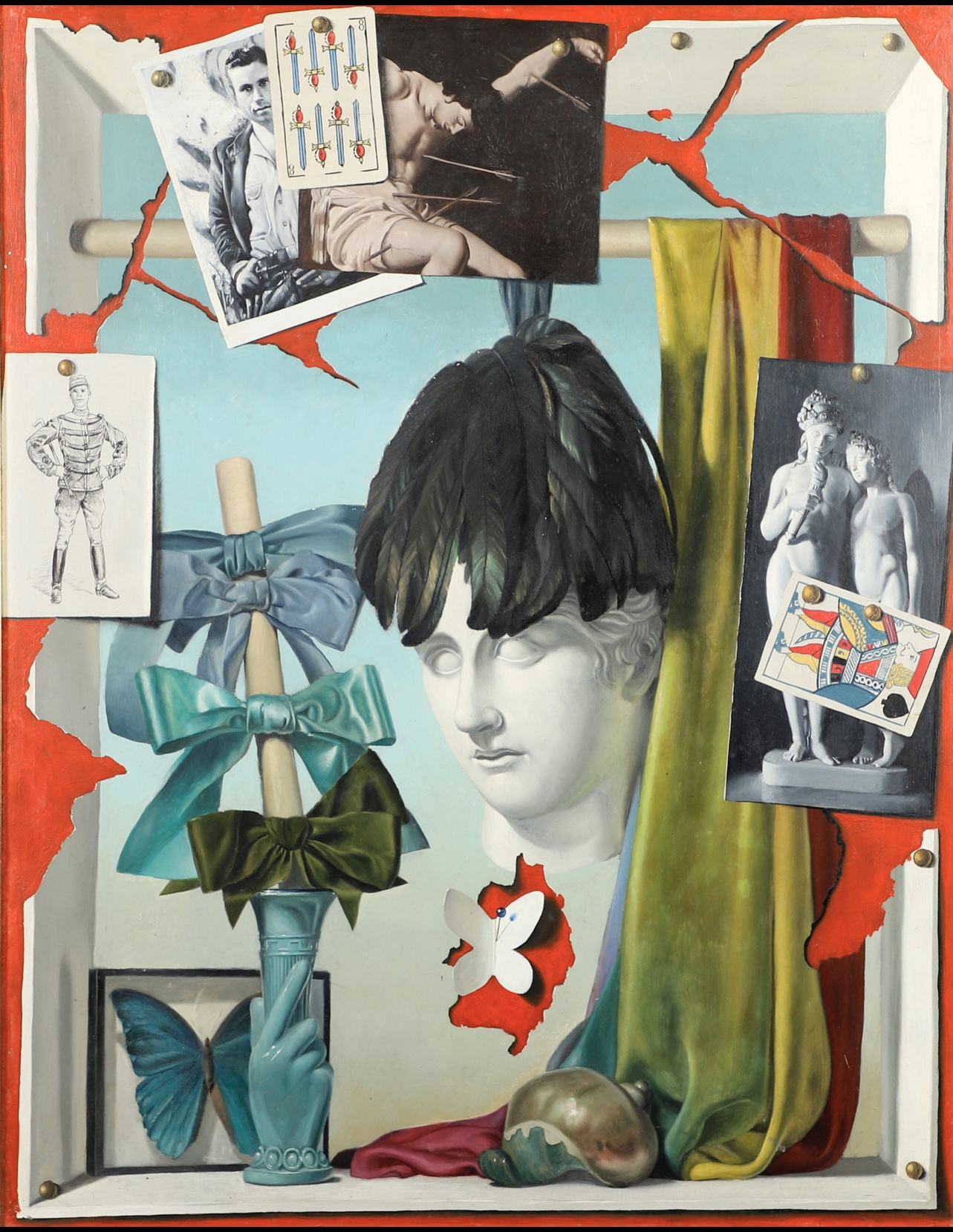
Martin Battersby, Captive Slave, oil on copper, 1950 - 64

== Artist and Muralist 1950 - 1960 ==
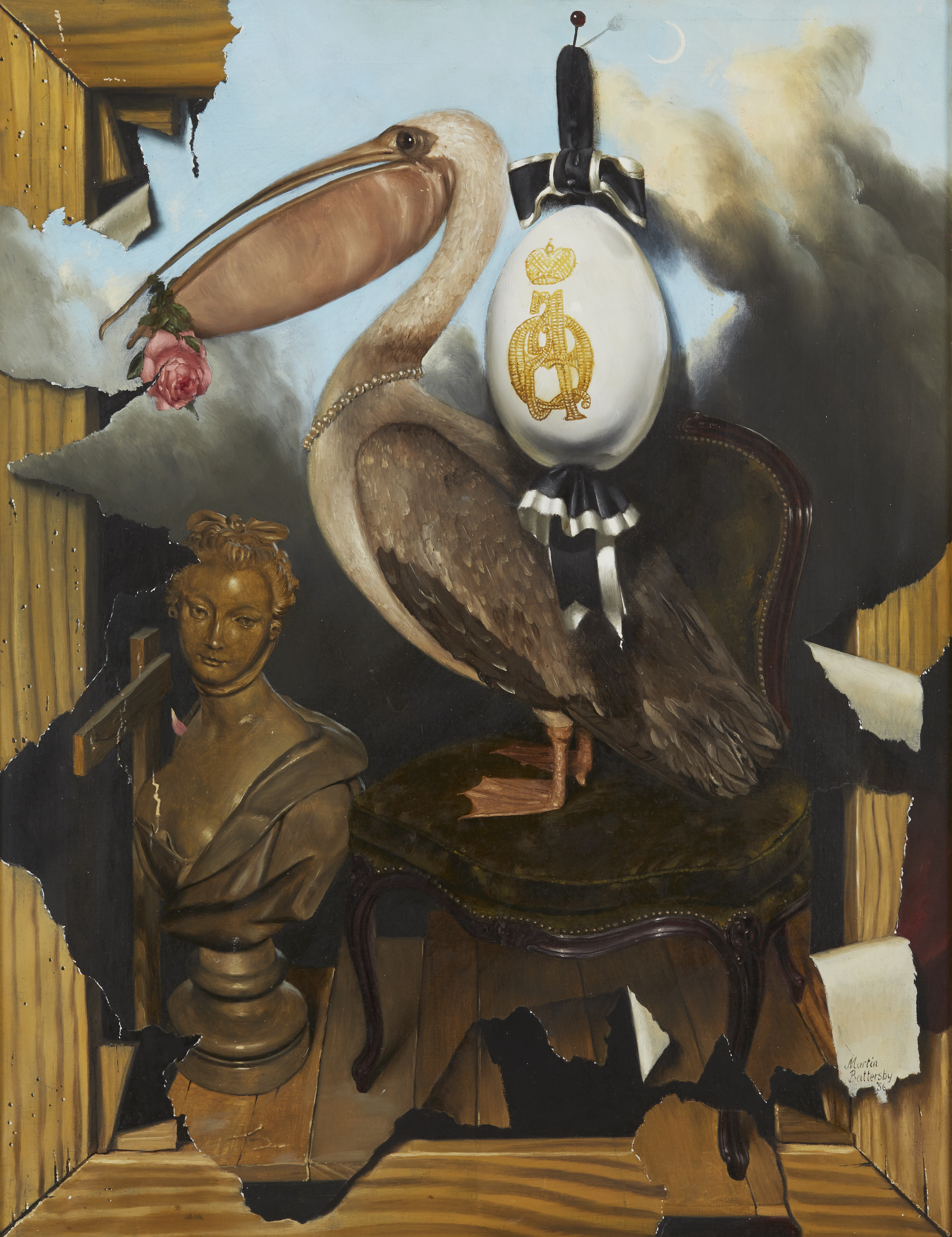
Martin Battersby, Oeuf a la Russes, oil on canvas, 1956

His career as an artist developed in parallel with other activities and he held his first one-man show in 1949 at the Brook Street Gallery, London. He became a master of the trompe-l'œil form and Still life and his work often reflected his obsessions with theatrical masks and sphinxes.

One-man shows followed in both Europe and America in the 1950s and 1960s. In 1952 a show opened at the Harrington Gallery in the Hague, the Netherlands, and in 1956 Battersby had his first solo exhibition in America at the Sagittarius Gallery in Manhattan, New York.

He also participated in a number of group shows including in 1954 The Eye Deceived at the Graves Art Gallery in Sheffield, England, and the following year Trompe L'oeil at the Arthur Jeffress (Pictures) gallery and the Exposition Internationale des Peintures de la Réalitié at the Marforen Gallery in Paris.

Battersby also produced large scale murals and enjoyed the support of a wide group of patrons in the 1950s and 1960s. An early commission was from Lady Diana Duff Cooper in 1950 for her home in Chantilly, just outside of Paris. Battersby created 11 panels en grisaille on copper.

The writer Evelyn Waugh asked Battersby to create a single panel for him after seeing Cooper's murals in-situ. Waugh wrote to fellow English novelist Nancy Mitford, 'Mr Battersby, the master of Chantilly came to stay. He's doing a panel for me. I quite liked him'

Other patrons included Audrey Pleydell-Bouverie, the Countess of Kenmare, Denis Martineau (for whom Battersby did seven panels at Mompesson House), and Valerie Hobson as a present for her husband, the British MP John Profumo.

== The Decorative Arts 1960 - 1978 ==
In 1960 Battersby moved to the south coast of England to the town of Brighton. From the 1960s onwards he began to develop his reputation as a collector, connoisseur and historian of the visual arts, decorating his home in Brighton in a typically lavish and eclectic way. In 1964 Brighton Museum & Art Gallery held the exhibition Art Nouveau: The Collection of Martin Battersby, the first exhibition in Britain dedicated solely to the subject.

In 1969, at the instigation of John Morley, his collection formed the basis for one of the first retrospectives in Britain of 1920s style when The Jazz Age was held. The exhibition was opened by Erté.

In 1965 Battersby established a design workshop and retail premises, Sphinx Studio, in Brighton. Battersby created designs which were hand-printed onto textiles and paper for home decoration and clothing. He also created unique designs for the French fashion house Christian Dior, Australian clothing company Cie, and The Beatles short-lived Apple Boutique on Baker Street, London.

In 1971, Battersby's business partner and boyfriend Paul Watson, committed suicide. Sphinx Studio closed soon after Watson's death.

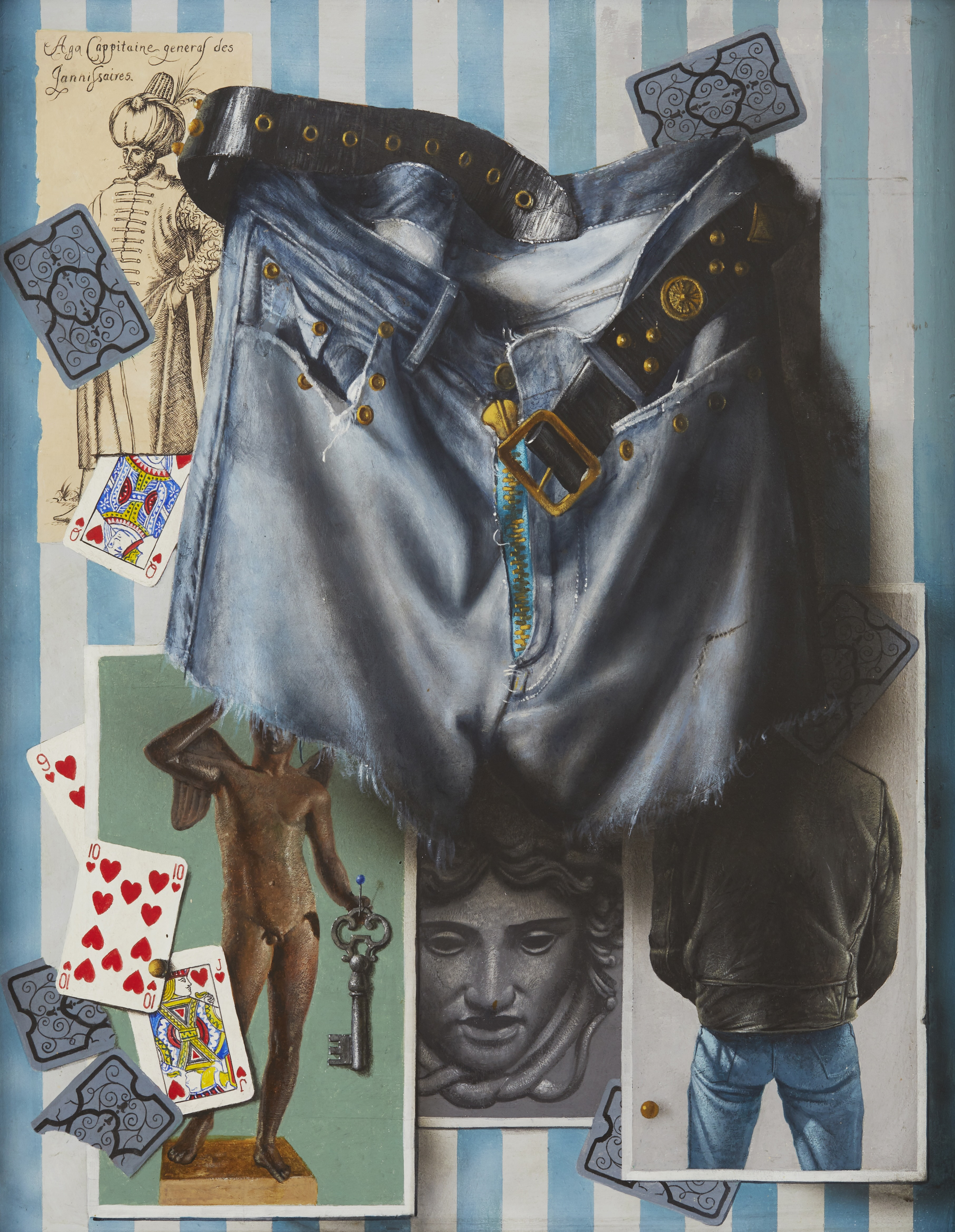
Martin Battersby, Jeans Trompe L'oeil, oil on board, c. 1978

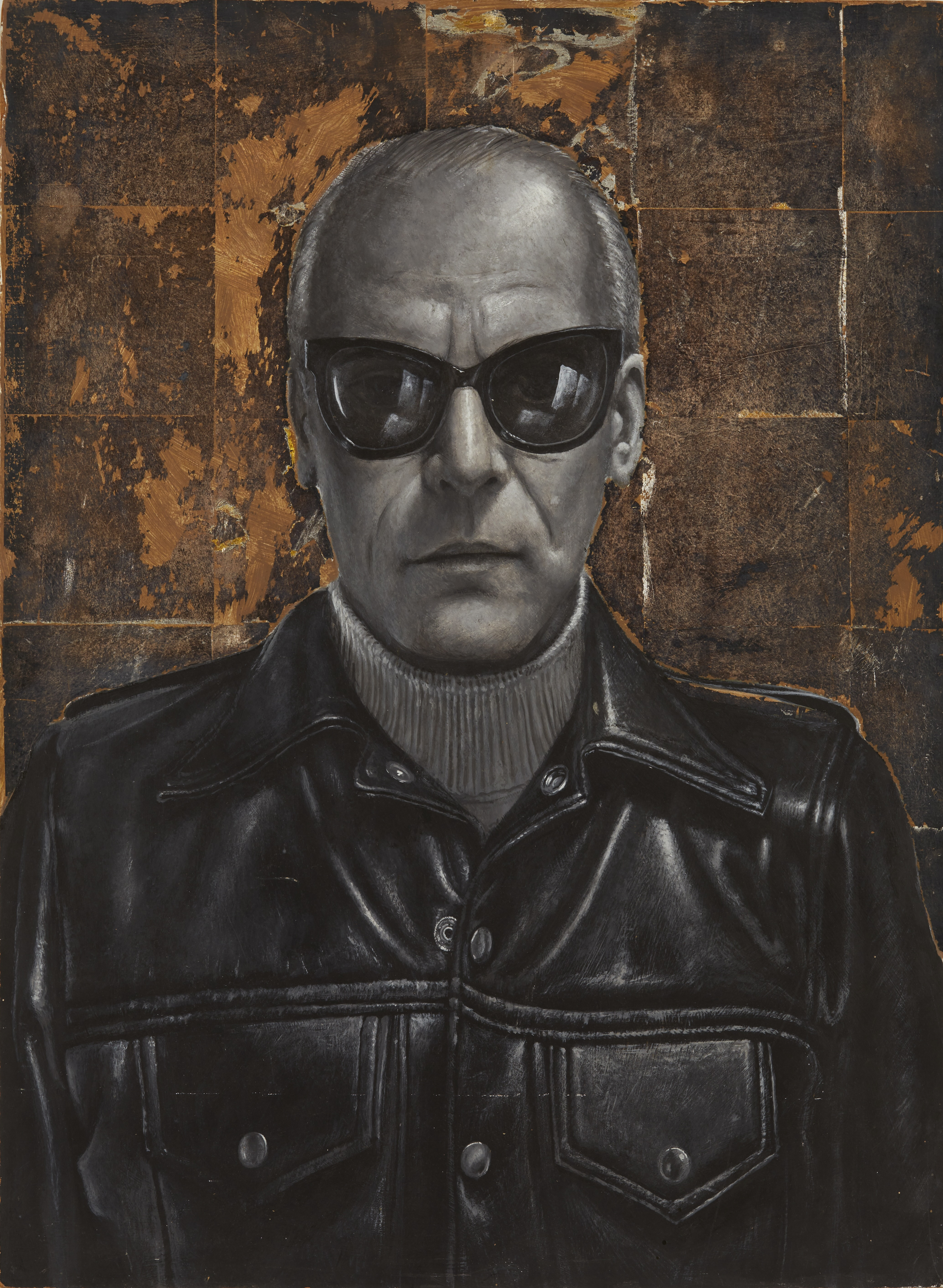
Martin Battersby, Self Portrait in Black Leather, oil on board, c. 1980

== Final Years 1978 - 1982 ==
In 1978, Battersby severed links with Brighton and his former interests, and moved to Fulham, London. Battersby immersed himself in the queer leather scene centered on the Coleherne, Earl's Court, a gay pub close to his home. Battersby's life on the gay scene became a central theme in his artworks.

He created works for a number of exhibitions. In 1982 Martin Battersby was held at the Ebury Gallery, London. This exhibition displayed over 30 paintings and was a retrospective, displaying trompe l'oeil paintings from the 1940s through to his latest homo-centric artworks. That same year Battersby had an exhibition at the Leslie-Lohman Museum of Gay and Lesbian Art (today the Leslie-Lohman Museum of Art) in New York. For this exhibition Battersby included overtly homoerotic paintings and intimate pencil drawings of naked gay men.

Battersby had suffered a series of illnesses over 1981 and he died of cancer in a small hospital in the town of Lewes aged 68 in April 1982.

== Publications ==
- The World of Art Nouveau, 1968.
- Art Nouveau, 1969.
- The Decorative Twenties, New York: Walker & Co., 1969.
- The Decorative Thirties, 1971.
- Art Deco Fashion, 1974.
- Trompe L'OEil, 1974.
