= James Pope-Hennessy =

British biographer and writer (1916–1974)

- Born: 20 November 1916; London, England
- Died: 25 January 1974 (aged 57); London, England
- Resting place: Kensal Green Cemetery in London
- Other name: Richard James Arthur Pope-Hennessy
- Occupation: Writer
- Known for: Queen Mary; Sins of the Fathers; Anthony Trollope

James Pope Hennessy CVO (20 November 1916 – 25 January 1974) was a British biographer and travel writer.

== Early life ==
Richard James Arthur Pope-Hennessy was born in London on 20 November 1916, the younger son of Ladislaus Herbert Richard Pope-Hennessy, a soldier from County Cork, Ireland, and his wife, Una, the daughter of Arthur Birch, Lieutenant-Governor of Ceylon. He was the younger of two sons; his elder brother, John Pope-Hennessy, was an English art historian, museum director and writer of note. James, as he was generally known, came from a close-knit Catholic family and was educated at Downside School and at Balliol College, Oxford, but generally showed a lack of interest in formal education and did not enjoy his time at either Downside or Oxford.

== Writing career ==
Largely owing to his mother's influence, he decided to become a writer and left Oxford in 1937 without taking a degree. He went to work for the Catholic publishers Sheed and Ward as an editorial assistant. While working at the company's offices, in Paternoster Row in London, he worked on his first book, London Fabric (1939), for which he was awarded the Hawthornden Prize. During this period, he was involved in a circle of notable literary figures including Harold Nicolson, Raymond Mortimer and James Lees-Milne.

He left the publishers in 1938 when his mother found him a job as private secretary to Hubert Young, the Governor of Trinidad. Although his time abroad provided the material for his later West Indian Summer (1943), he disliked both the West Indies and the atmosphere of Government House. The outbreak of the Second World War gave him an excuse to return to Britain, where he enlisted as a private in an anti-aircraft battery under the command of Sir Victor Cazalet. Rising through the ranks, he was transferred to military intelligence, given a commission and spent the latter part of the war as a member of the British army staff at Washington.

Pope-Hennessy enjoyed his time in the United States and made many friends there. After the end of the war he wrote an account of his experiences in America. On his return to London in 1945 he shared a flat with the British intelligence officer Guy Burgess, who later defected to the Soviet Union. He had a brief spell as the literary editor of The Spectator between 1947 and 1949, before he decided to travel to France and write Aspects of Provence, which was published in 1952.

He would eventually establish himself as one of the leading biographers of his time; his first effort in this direction being a two-volume biography of Monckton Milnes that appeared in 1949 under the titles The Years of Promise and The Flight of Youth. This was followed by further biographies of the Earl of Crewe and of Queen Mary, for which he was created Commander of the Royal Victorian Order in 1960. He also wrote a life of his grandfather, the colonial governor John Pope Hennessy, under the title Verandah (adapted as a documentary for BBC Television under the title "Strange Excellency", 1964), followed by an account of the Atlantic slave traffickers, Sins of the Fathers (1967).

In 1970, he took out Irish citizenship and went to live at Banagher in County Offaly, where he took rooms at the Shannon Hotel, and during the next few years produced authoritative biographies of both Anthony Trollope and Robert Louis Stevenson. Trollope himself had chosen James' grandfather, John Pope Hennessy, as the basis for the character Phineas Finn in his novel of the same name. Robert Louis Stevenson was published posthumously and without revision in 1974. He became a popular figure in Banagher, evidenced by the fact that he was asked to adjudicate at a local beauty pageant and the Banagher Horse Fair, the oldest in Ireland. On being given a large advance he returned to London in 1974 to begin work on his next subject, Noël Coward.

== Death and personal life ==
Despite being a successful professional writer, Pope-Hennessy was careless with money. He suffered a series of financial crises and often relied on the goodwill of friends to get him by. He was "incurably extravagant like his father", according to his brother John, and from 1964 he was faced with insolvency. When writing his biography of Queen Mary he lived in Hagnau, Germany where living was cheaper.

His "natural rebelliousness was accentuated by his unremitting homosexuality" according to James Lees-Milne, but while physically attracted to his own sex he loved the companionship of women, and was sought after by hostesses for his sparkling conversation. His friends were among the most interesting artists, writers and muses of their generation: Cecil Beaton, Clarissa Churchill (later Clarissa Eden, Countess of Avon), Joan Moore (Countess of Drogheda), Viscountess Rothermere (Ann Fleming) and Lees-Milne.

He was a heavy drinker, and frequented back-street bars and shady pubs where he mixed with a rough crowd, associations that eventually contributed to his death when he was brutally killed on 25 January 1974 in his London flat, at 9 Ladbroke Grove, by three young men. He had been acquainted with one of them as part of the rough trade. However the three young men involved were jailed for manslaughter; their sentences were reduced on appeal as he had only suffered superficial injuries and died from choking on his own blood from a lip wound. In 1973 he had been commissioned to write a biography of Noël Coward, and he spoke openly of the cash advance, implying it was in cash and kept in his home.

He is buried at Kensal Green Cemetery in west London.

== Bibliography ==
- London Fabric (Dustjacket by Eric Ravilious; 1939, revised 1941)
- History Under Fire – 52 Photographs of Air Raid Damage to London Buildings, 1940–41 (With Cecil Beaton; 1941)
- West Indian Summer (1943)
- The Houses of Parliament. Photographed by Hans Wild. (Introduction; 1946)
- America is an Atmosphere (1947)
- The Years of Promise (1949)
- Beautiful London. 103 photographs by Helmut Gernsheim. (Foreword; 1950)
- The Flight of Youth (1951)
- Aspects of Provence (1952)
- The Baths of Absalom (1954)
- Lord Crewe, the Likeness of a Liberal (1955)
- Queen Mary (1959)
- Queen Victoria at Windsor and Balmoral (1959)
- Verandah (1964)
- Sins of the Fathers (1967)
- Half-Crown Colony: A Hong Kong Notebook (1969)
- Anthony Trollope (1971)
- Robert Louis Stevenson (1974)
- A Lonely Business – A Self Portrait of James Pope-Hennessy (1981). Edited by Peter Quennell.
- The Quest for Queen Mary (2018). Edited and with text by Hugo Vickers.
