= Palazzo Canigiani, Florence =

Coordinates: 43.76559°N 11.25660°E

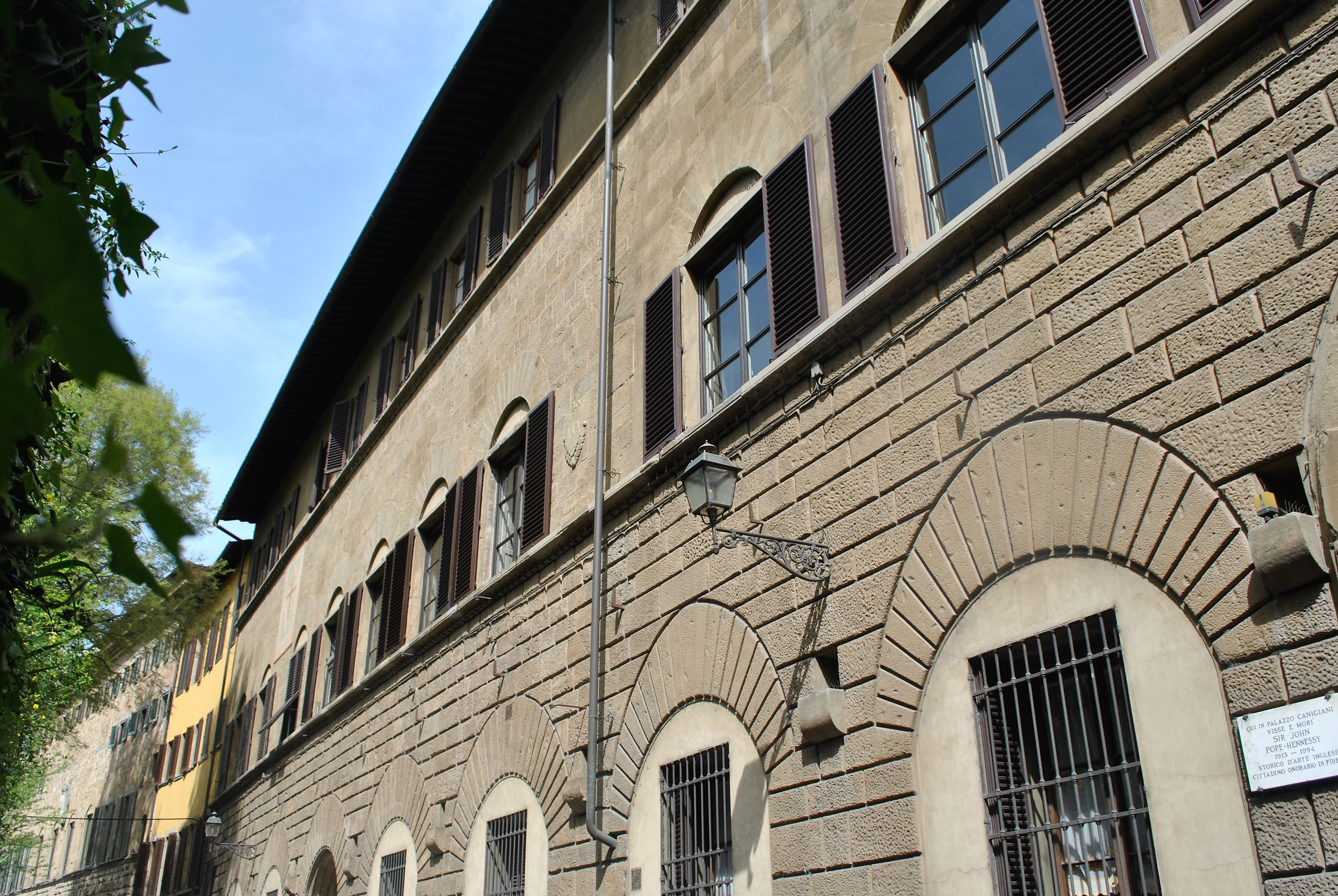
Palazzo Canigiani

The Palazzo Canigiani, initially built as Palazzo Bardi-Larioni, and later also known as Canigiani-Guigni is a Neoclassic-style palace located in Via de' Bardi 28 in the quartiere of Santo Spirito in central Florence, region of Tuscany, Italy.

== History ==
Part of the site was once occupied by the Palazzo Larioni de' Bardi, and the ancient hospital of the Church of Santa Lucia dei Magnoli. From various buildings, a larger domicile had been constructed by 1283. At this early palace was born Eletta de' Canigiani, the mother of Petrarch. In 1465, the bankrupt Bardi sold the palace to the Canigiani. Between 1819 and 1838, Tommaso Giugni, who had married the last heir of the Canigiani, refurbished the structure, both the interiors and facade, in a neoclassical style. That reconstruction included the destruction of a 17th-century fresco depicting an encounter between Saints Dominic and Francis that occurred in the hospital. However, there is no historical documentation of this encounter.

In the hospital in 1994, the British art historian Sir John Pope-Hennessy died at this site.
