= Arthur Birch (colonial administrator) =

British colonial governor (1836–1914)

Sir Arthur Nonus Birch KCMG (September 1837 – 31 October 1914) was Lieutenant Governor of Ceylon, Colonial Secretary for Ceylon and acting Lieutenant Governor of Penang and Province Wellesley (1871-1872).

The son of Rev. Henry William Rous Birch, rector of Reydon and Bedfield, Suffolk, and was baptised at Yoxford, Suffolk on 23 Oct 1836. He joined the colonial service as clerk in the Office of the Secretary of State for the Colonies in February 1855, served as Sir Edward Bulwer-Lytton's assistant private secretary in 1858, and Chichester Fortescue's private secretary from September 1859 to February 1864 when he accepted the post of colonial secretary of British Columbia. He served in that capacity and for a time as administrator of the government until 1866 when he returned to England to resume his duties in the Colonial Office. He remained with the Colonial Office, serving as acting Lieutenant Governor of Penang and Province Wellesley, colonial secretary of Ceylon and Lieutenant Governor of Ceylon, until his retirement from the service in June 1878.

After his resignation from the Colonial Office Birch joined the Bank of England where he remained until retirement in 1913.

On 29 May 1873 Birch married Josephine (or "Zephine", d. 1893) at Oundle, Northamptonshire. She was the daughter of Jesse Watts-Russell, MP, of Biggin Hall, Northamptonshire. Their elder son and heir, Wyndham, was born in 1874, and married the only daughter of John Manners Yorke, 7th Earl of Hardwicke; younger son Arthur adopted his mother's surname and became a Captain in the Coldstream Guards. Birch's daughter was the writer Dame Una Pope-Hennessy.

== Legacy ==
Mount Birch, in the central Camelsfoot Range near Lillooet, British Columbia, Canada, is named for him.
