= Stapler =

Tool used to fasten paper or flesh together

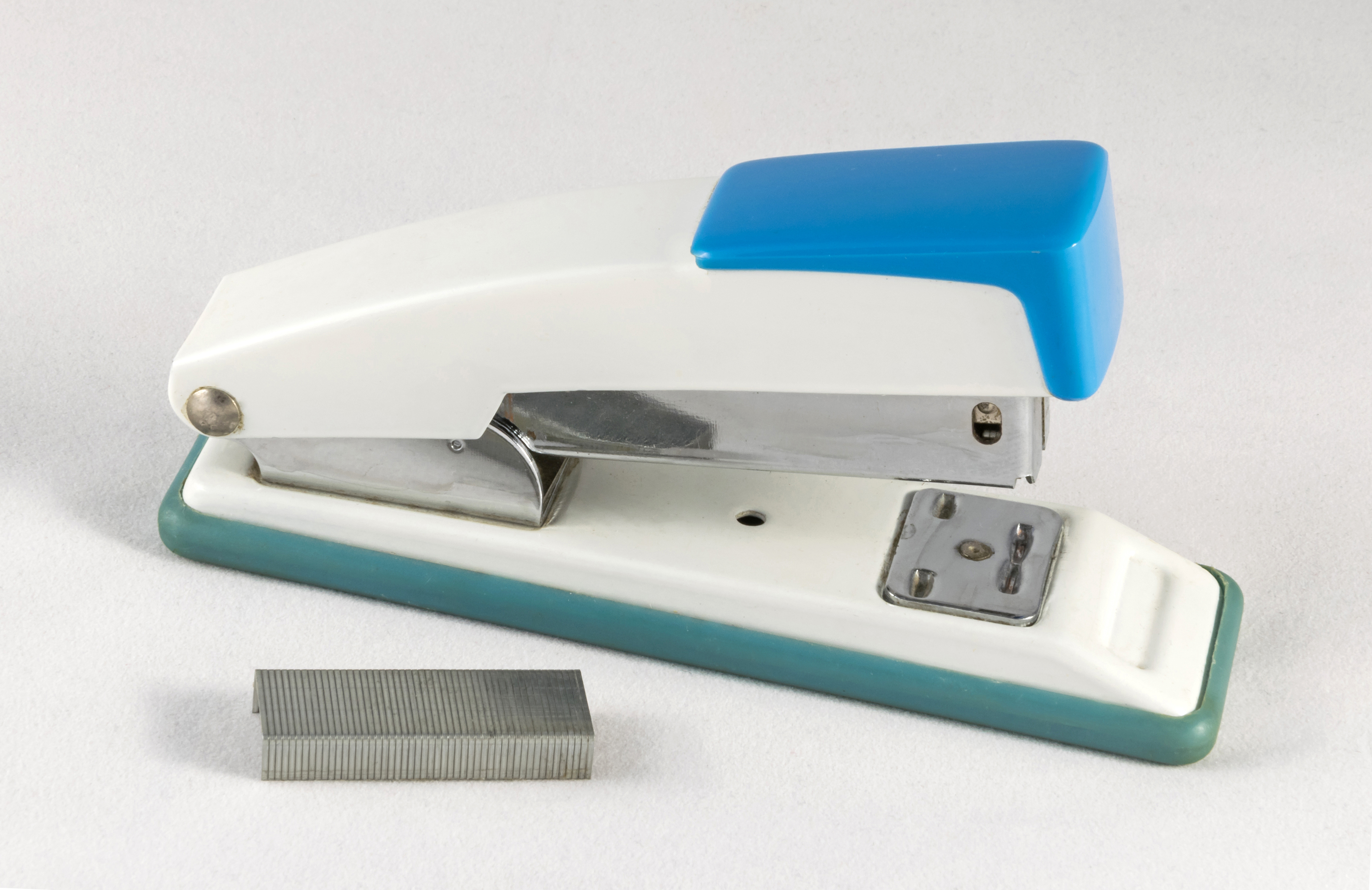
Office stapler

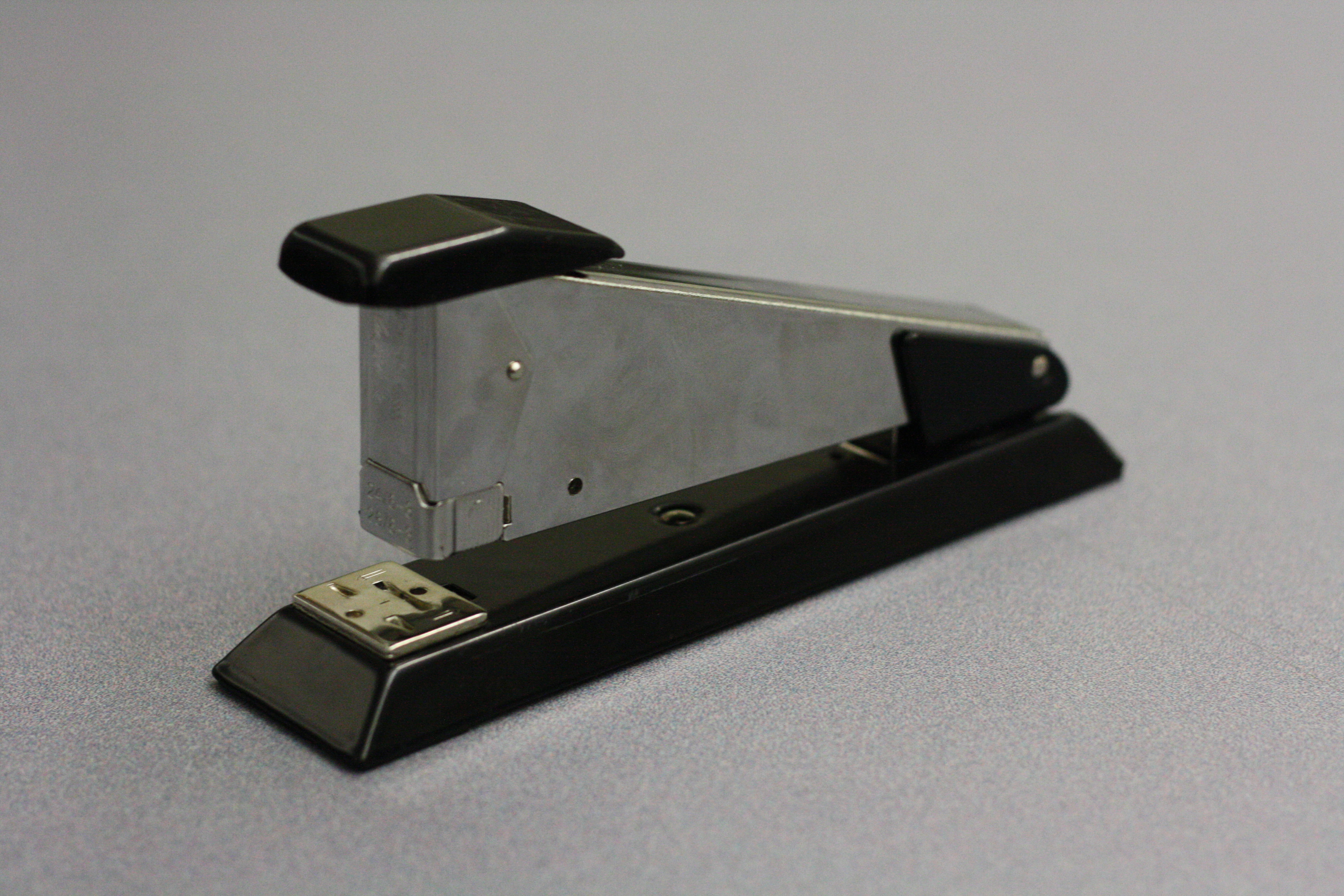
A spring-loaded stapler

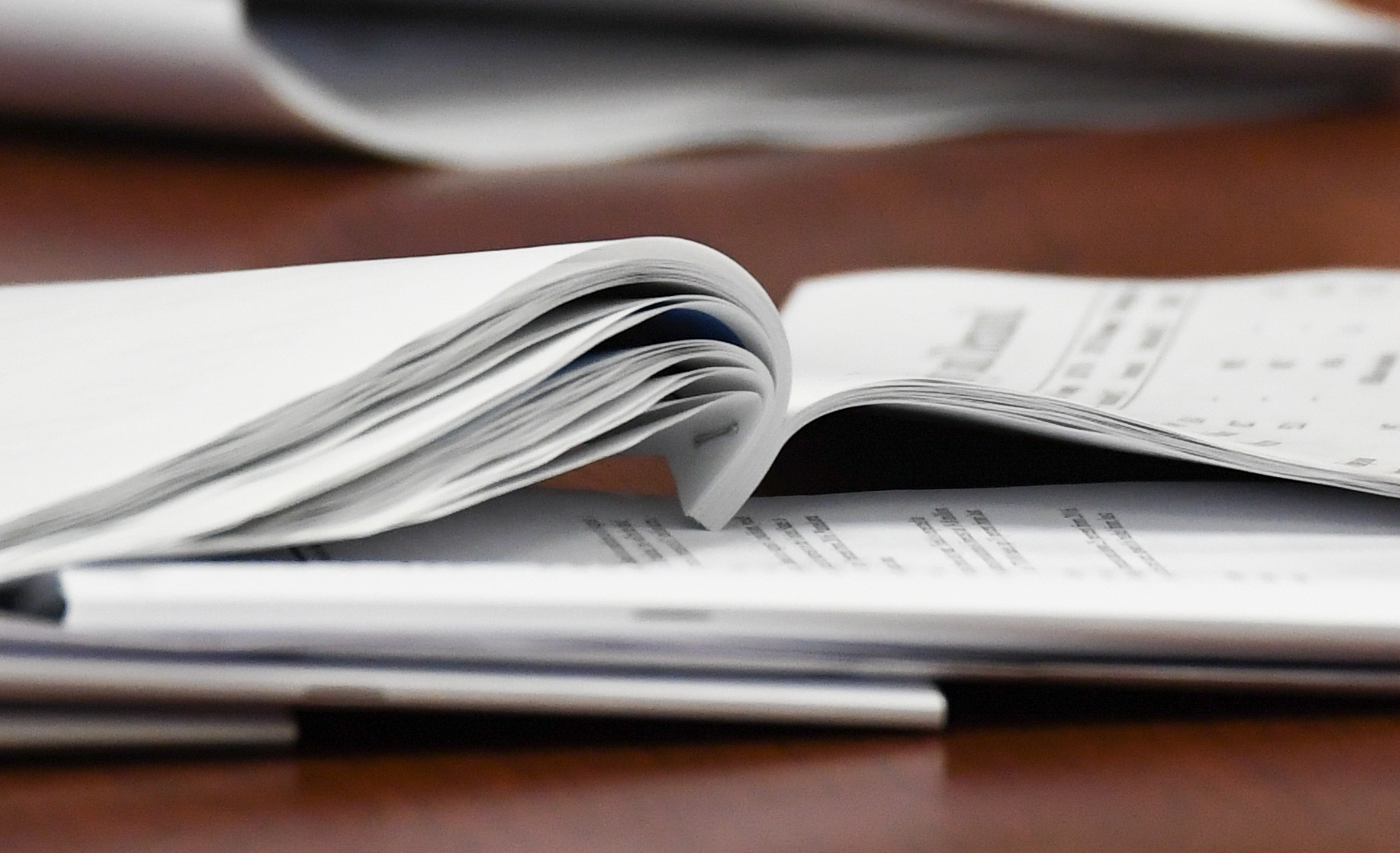
Stapled paper sheets

A stapler is a mechanical device that joins pages of paper or similar material together by driving a thin metal staple through the sheets and folding the ends. Staplers are widely used in government, business, offices, workplaces, homes, and schools.

The word "stapler" can actually refer to a number of different devices of varying uses. In addition to joining paper sheets together, staplers can also be used in a surgical setting to join tissue together with surgical staples to close a surgical wound (much in the same way as sutures).

Most staplers are used to join multiple sheets of paper. Paper staplers come in two distinct types: manual and electric. Manual staplers are normally hand-held, although models that are used while set on a desk or other surface are not uncommon. Electric staplers exist in a variety of different designs and models. Their primary operating function is to join large numbers of paper sheets together in rapid succession. Some electric staplers can join up to 20 sheets at a time. Typical staplers are third-class levers.

== History ==
The growing usage of paper in the 19th century created a demand for an efficient paper fastener.

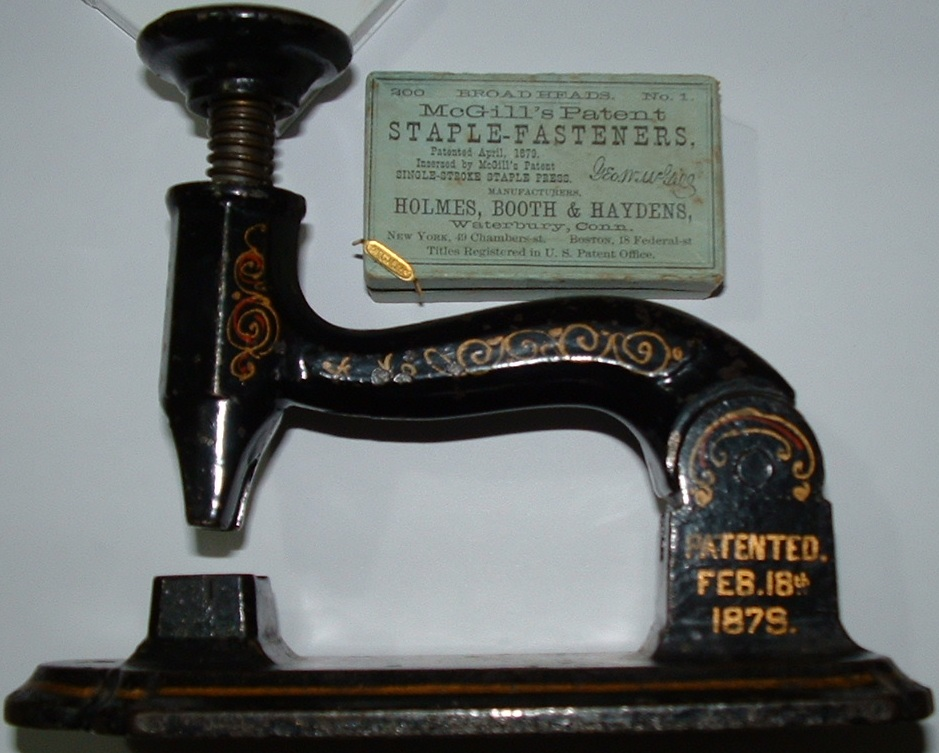
A McGill stapler

In 1841 Slocum and Jillion invented a "Machine for Sticking Pins into Paper", which is often believed to be the first stapler. But their patent (September 30, 1841, Patent #2275) is for a device used for packaging pins. In 1866, George McGill received U.S. patent 56,587 for a small, bendable brass paper fastener that was a precursor to the modern staple. In 1867, he received U.S. patent 67,665 for a press to insert the fastener into paper. He showed his invention at the 1876 Centennial Exhibition in Philadelphia, Pennsylvania, where architect Merik Herron helped make the base shape of the staple, and continued to work on this and various other paper fasteners throughout the 1880s. In 1868 an English patent for a stapler was awarded to C. H. Gould, and in the U.S., Albert Kletzker of St. Louis, Missouri, also patented a device.

In 1877 Henry R. Heyl filed patent number 195,603 for the first machines to both insert and clinch a staple in one step, and for this reason some consider him the inventor of the modern stapler. In 1876 and 1877, Heyl also filed patents for the Novelty Paper Box Manufacturing Co. of Philadelphia, PA, However, the N. P. B. Manufacturing Co.'s inventions were to be used to staple boxes and books.

The first machine to hold a magazine of many pre-formed staples came out in 1878.

On February 18, 1879, George McGill received patent 212,316 for the McGill Single-Stroke Staple Press, the first commercially successful stapler. This device weighed over two and a half pounds and loaded a single 1/2-inch-wide (13 mm) wire staple, which it could drive through several sheets of paper.

The first published use of the word "stapler" to indicate a machine for fastening papers with a thin metal wire was in an advertisement in the American Munsey's Magazine in 1901.

In the early 1900s, several devices were developed and patented that punched and folded papers to attach them to each other without a metallic clip. The Clipless Stand Machine (made in North Berwick) was sold from 1909 into the 1920s. It cut a tongue in the paper that it folded back and tucked in. Bump's New Model Paper Fastener used a similar cutting and weaving technology.

=== The modern stapler ===
In 1941, the type of paper stapler that is the most common in use was developed: the four-way paper stapler. With the four-way, the operator could either use the stapler to staple papers to wood or cardboard, use pliers for bags, or use the normal way with the head positioned a small distance above the stapling plate. The stapling plate is known as the anvil. The anvil often has two settings: the first, and by far most common, is the reflexive setting, also known as the "permanent" setting. In this position, the legs of the staple are folded toward the center of the crossbar. It is used to staple papers which are not expected to need separation. If rotated 180° or slid to its second position, the anvil will be set on the sheer setting, also known as the "temporary" or "straight" setting. In this position, the legs of the staple are folded outwards, away from the crossbar, resulting in the legs and crossbar being in more or less a straight line. Stapling with this setting will result in more weakly secured papers but a staple that is much easier to remove. The use of the second setting is almost never seen, however, due to the prevalence of staple removers and the general lack of knowledge about its use. Some simple modern staplers feature a fixed anvil that lacks the sheer position.

Modern staplers continue to evolve and adapt to users' changing habits. Less effort or easy-squeeze/use staplers, for example, use different leverage efficiencies to reduce the amount of force the user needs to apply. As a result, these staplers tend to be used in work environments where repetitive, large stapling jobs are routine.

Some modern desktop staplers make use of Flat Clinch technology. With Flat Clinch staplers, the staple legs first pierce the paper and are then bent over and pressed absolutely flat against the paper – doing away with the two-setting anvil commonly used and making use of a recessed stapling base in which the legs are folded. Accordingly, staples do not have sharper edges exposed and lead to flatter stacking of paper – saving on filing and binder space.

Some photocopiers feature an integrated stapler allowing copies of documents to be automatically stapled as they are printed.

== Industry ==
In 2012, $80 million worth of staplers were sold in the US. The dominant US manufacturer is Swingline.

== Methods ==
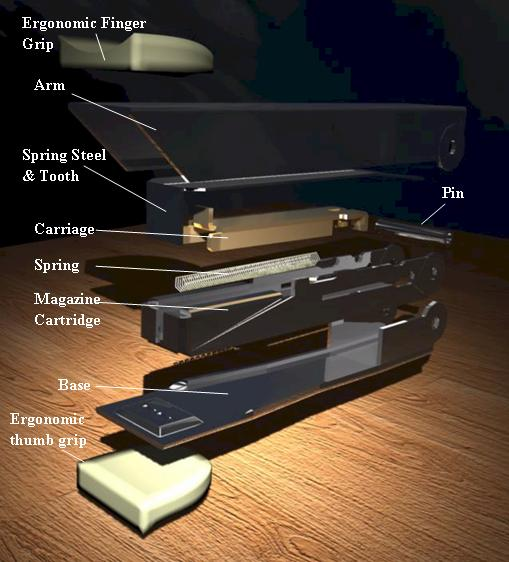
An exploded view drawing

Permanent fastening binds items by driving the staple through the material and into an anvil, a small metal plate that bends the ends, usually inward. On most modern staplers, the anvil rotates or slides to change between bending the staple ends inward for permanent stapling or outward for pinning (see below). Clinches can be standard, squiggled, flat, or rounded completely adjacent to the paper to facilitate neater document stacking.

Pinning temporarily binds documents or other items. To pin, the anvil slides or rotates so that the staple bends outwards instead of inwards. Some staplers pin by bending one leg of the staple inwards and the other outwards. The staple binds the item with relative security but is easily removed.

Tacking fastens objects to surfaces, such as bulletin boards or walls. A stapler that can tack has a base that folds back out of the way, so staples drive directly into an object rather than fold against the anvil. In this position, the staples are driven similar to the way a staple gun works, but with less force driving the staple.

Saddle staplers have an inverted V-shaped saddle for stapling pre-fold sheets to make booklets.

Stapleless staplers, invented in 1910, are a means of stapling that punches out a small flap of paper and weaves it through a notch. A more recent alternative method avoids the resulting hole by crimping the pages together with serrated metal teeth instead.

== Surgical staplers ==
Surgeons can use surgical staplers in place of sutures to close the skin or during surgical anastomosis.

A skin stapler does not resemble a standard stapler, as it has no anvil. Skin staples are commonly preshaped into an "M." Pressing the stapler into the skin and applying pressure onto the handle bends the staple through the skin and into the fascia until the two ends almost meet in the middle to form a rectangle.

Staplers are commonly used intra-operatively during bowel resections in colorectal surgery. Often these staplers have an integral knife which, as the staples deploy, cuts through the bowel and maintains the aseptic field. The staples, made from surgical steel, are typically supplied in disposable sterilized cartridges.

== Types ==
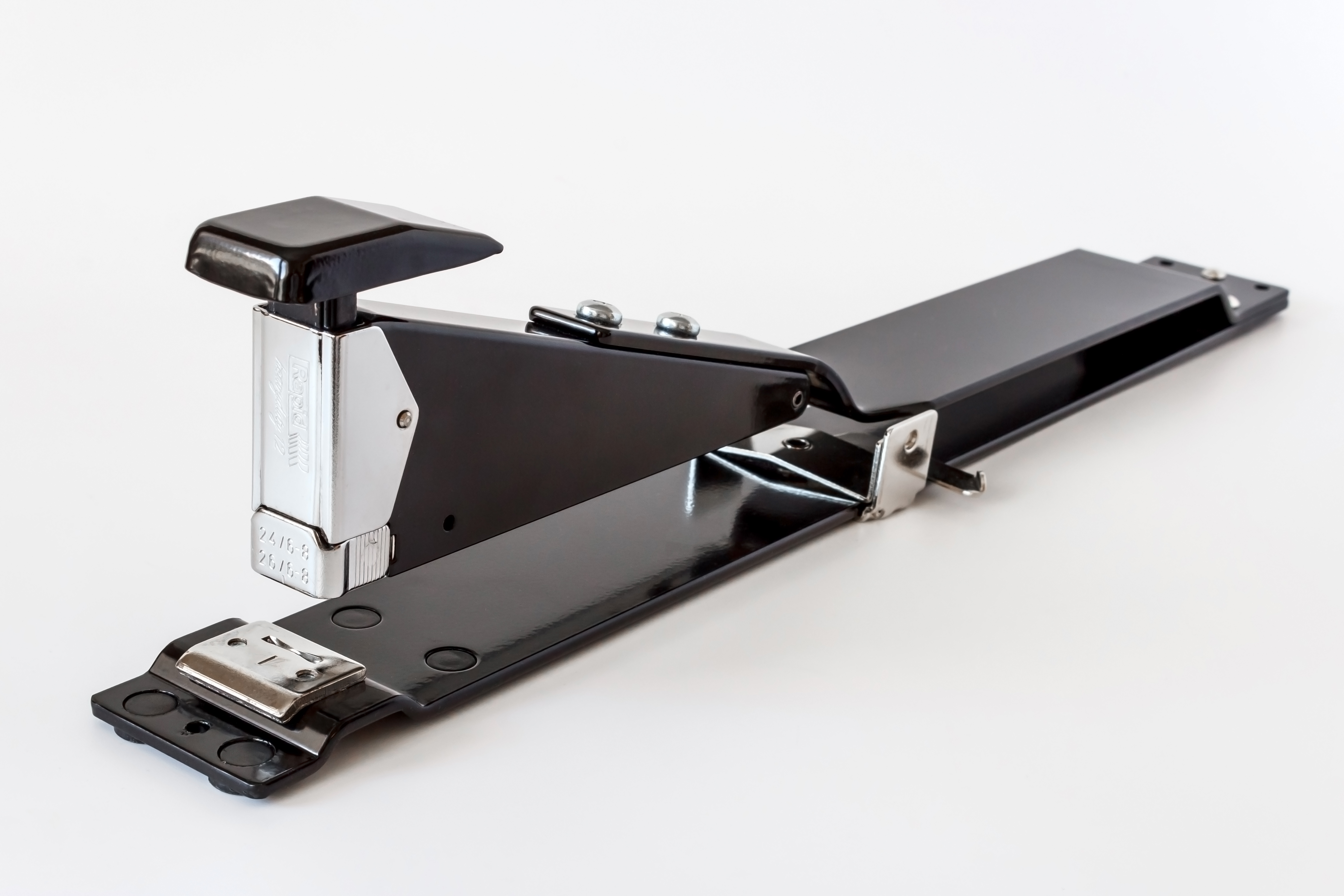
A long-reach stapler is used to staple items such as booklets.

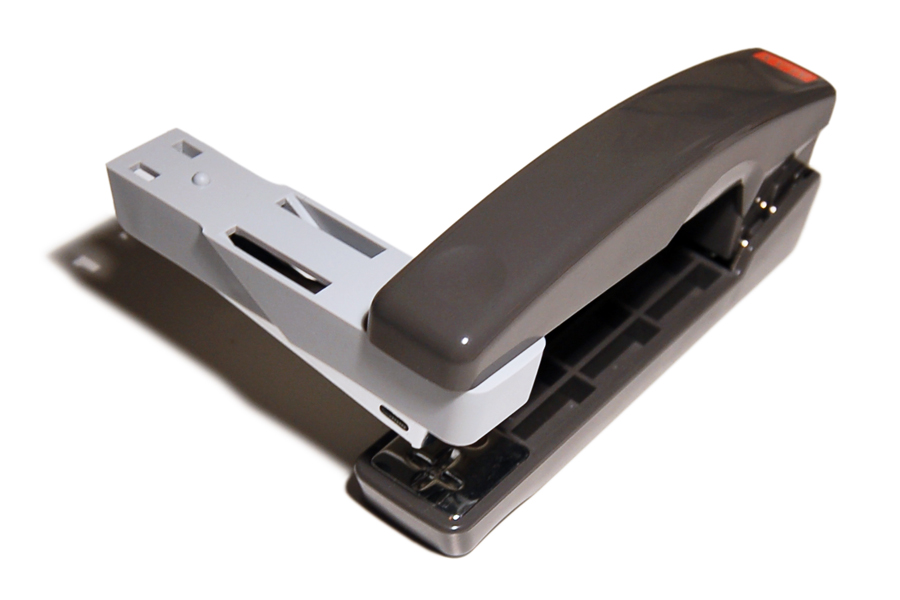
A booklet stapler that rotates 90 degrees for vertical or horizontal stapling.

Clipless Stand Machine.

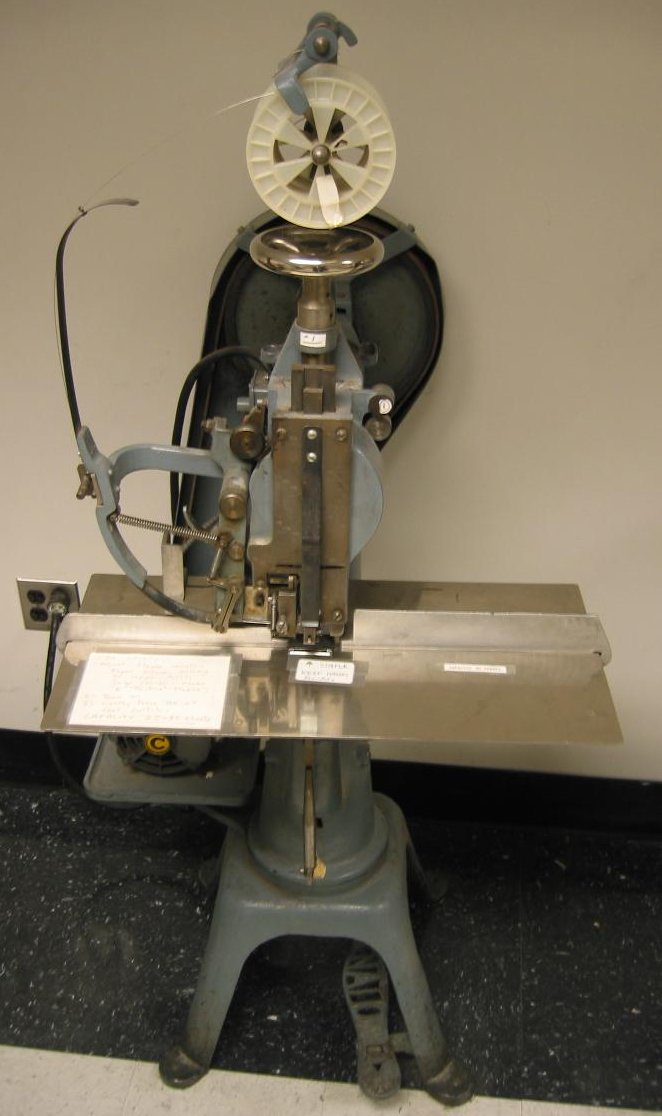
Heavy-duty foot-activated electric stapler.

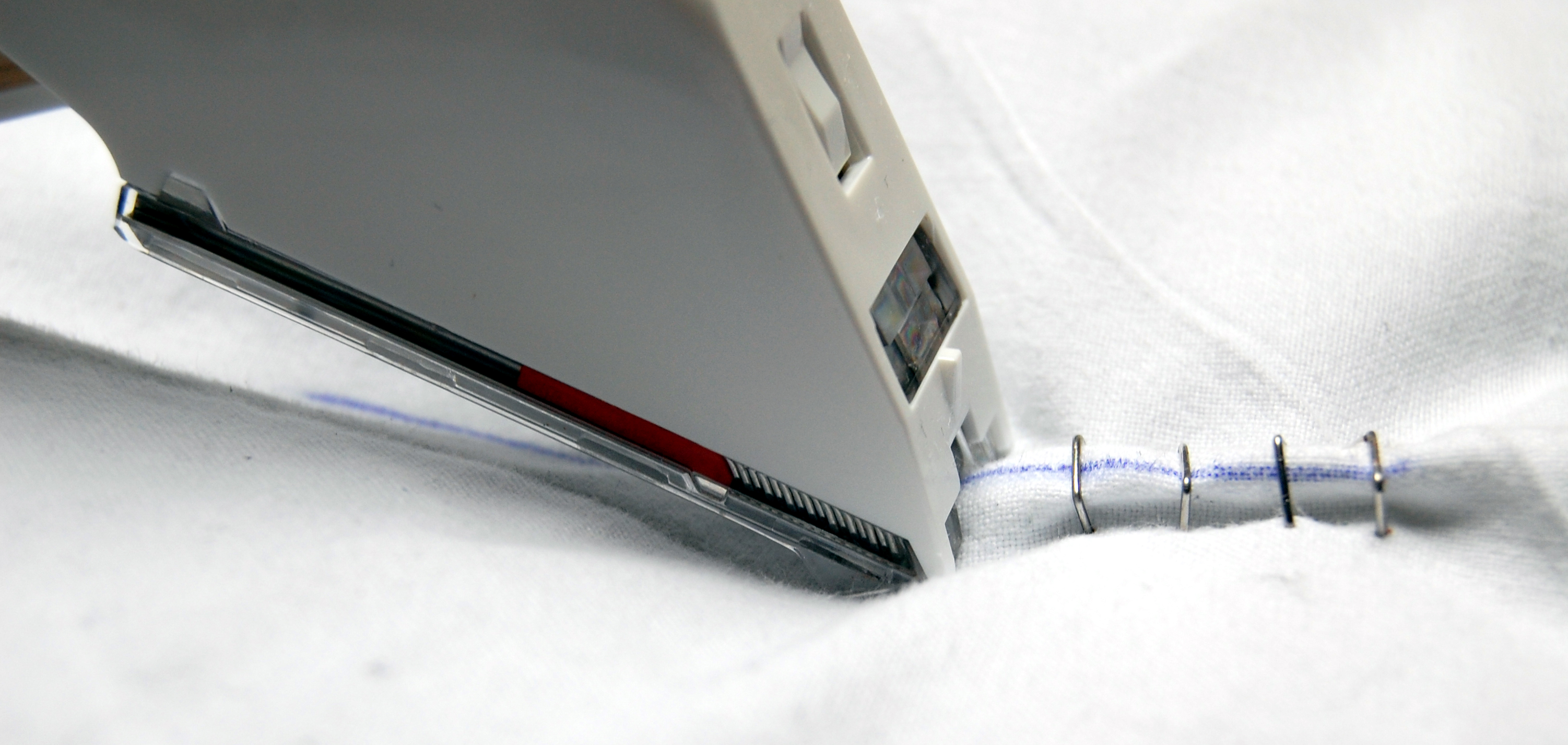
Skin stapler

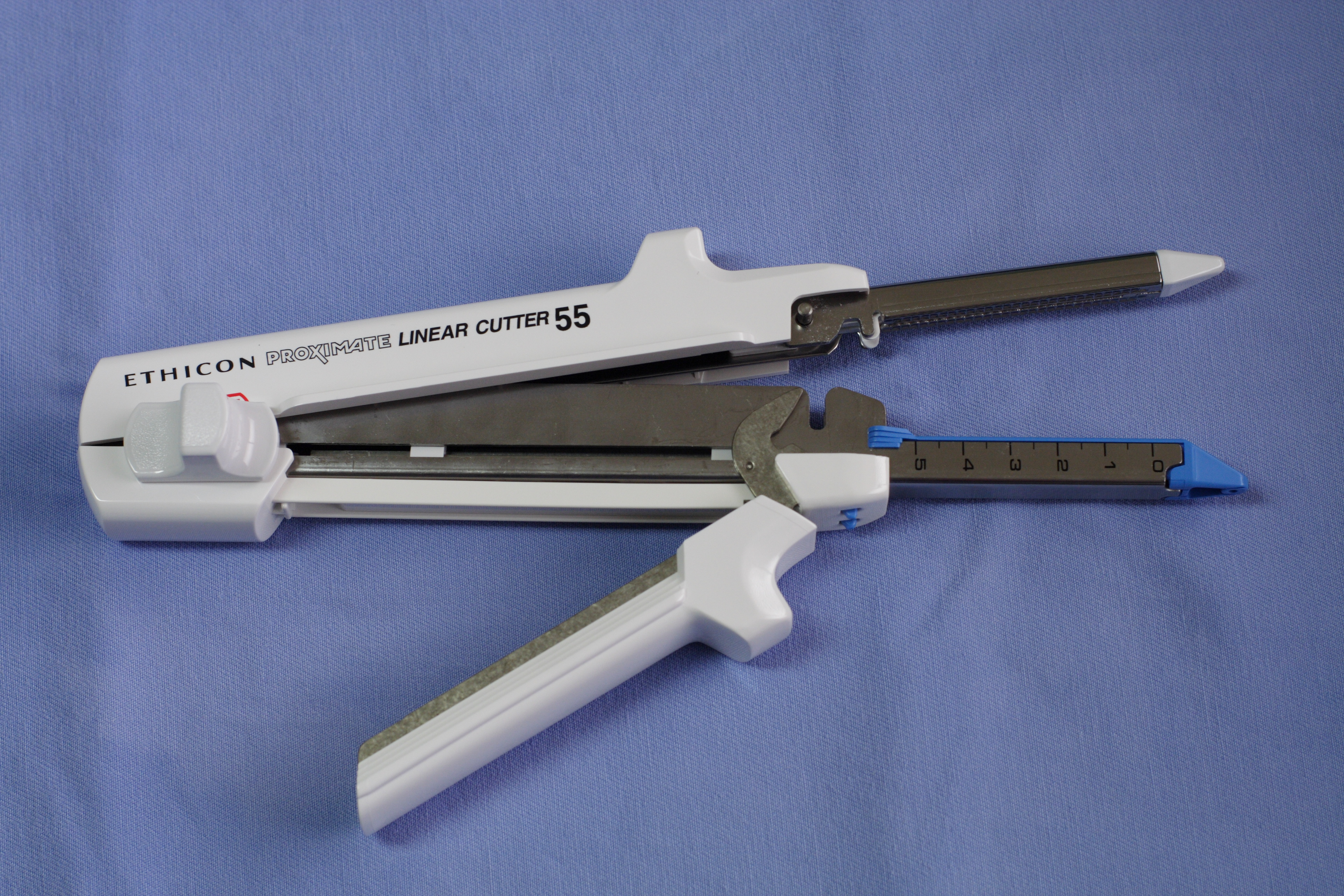
Surgical stapler

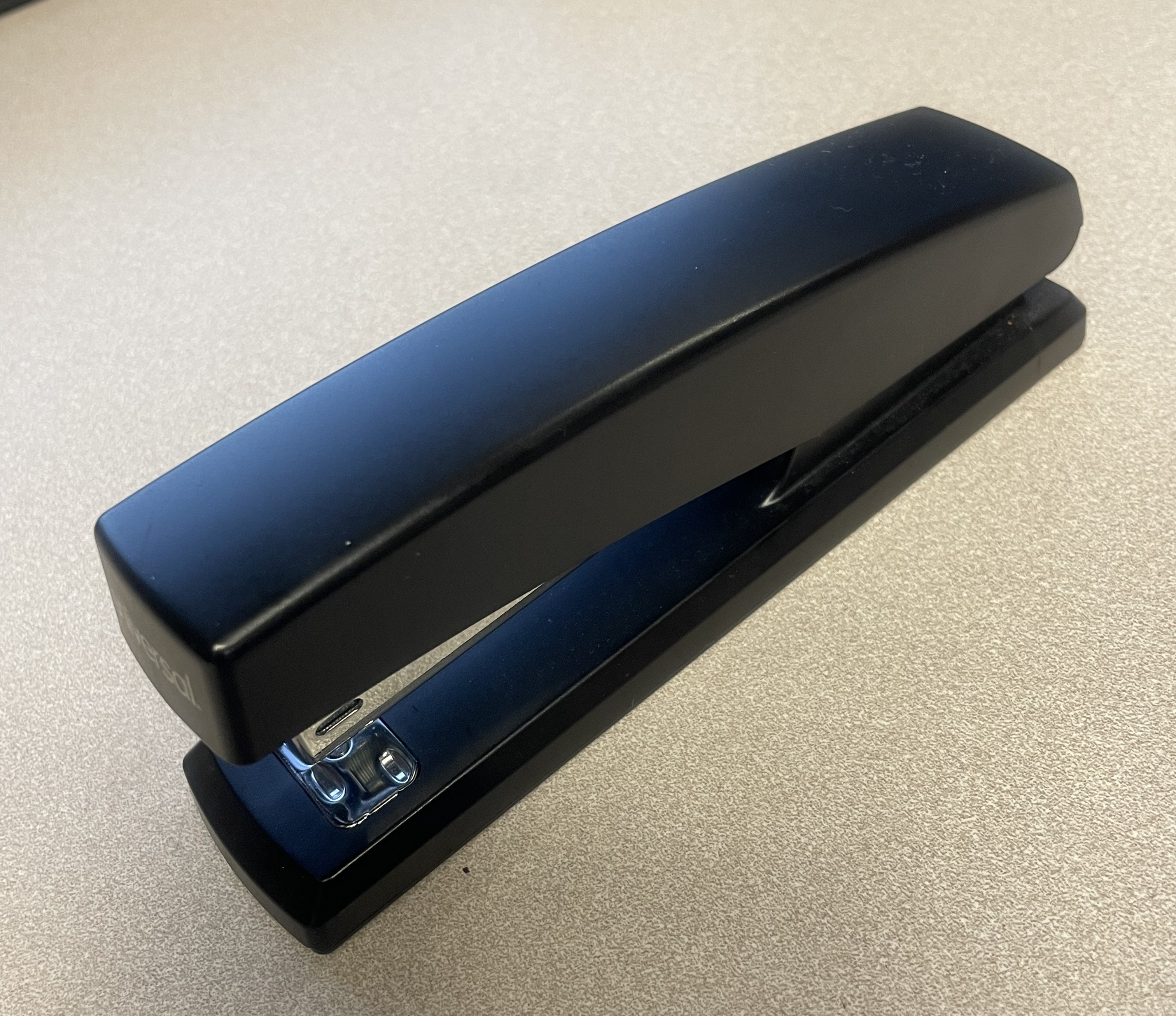
Desk stapler

== See also ==
- Office Space, a 1999 comedy film where a stapler is one of the plot objects
- Staple remover
- Staple gun
