= Belle Linsky =

Ukrainian-born American businesswoman (1904–1987)

- Born: 1904
- Died: 1987 (aged 82–83)
- Occupation: Art collector

Belle Linsky (1904–1987) was a businesswoman and philanthropist who was a Swingline Inc. executive with her husband, Swingline's president Jack Linsky. In 1982, she donated much of her art collection, valued at $90 million, to the Metropolitan Museum of Art.

== Life ==
Belle Linsky was born in Kiev in 1904, and came to the United States as a child. With her husband she owned 19 percent of the stock of the Swingline corporation, based in New York City at the time, which they sold to American Brands Inc. in 1970 for $210 million. She was treasurer of Swingline at the time of the sale and Jack Linsky was inventor, president, and chairman. Jack Linsky and Belle Linsky had a daughter named Muriel.

At the end of her life, Belle Linsky lived in Palm Beach, Florida and Manhattan, New York where much of her art collection is now housed at The Met. She died in New York on Monday, September 28, 1987.

== Philanthropy and art collection ==
In 1965, Jack and Belle Linsky endowed for $7 million a pavilion that bears their name at the Beth Israel Medical Center in Manhattan.

Belle and her husband, Jack Linsky, started collecting art during The Great Depression, and through profits procured by ownership of Swingline the Jack and Belle Linsky Collection of art was made gathered. After Mr. Jack Linsky died in 1980, much of the Linsky family art collection was retained. In 1982, Mrs. Linsky decided to donate to The Metropolitan Museum of Art in New York now known as The Met, and other American museums also received donations. The art collection of Belle Linsky includes more than 1,000 objects. Most of the art collected by Belle Linsky is housed in the 3,980 square-foot Jack and Belle Linsky Galleries at the museum.

At a point in time, Belle Linsky had the largest Fabergé egg collection in America.

== See also ==
- Jack and Belle Linsky Collection
