= Swingline =

Division of ACCO Brands

- Type: Subsidiary
- Industry: Office supplies
- Founded: 1925 (New York City)
- Headquarters: Lincolnshire, Illinois
- Products: Staplers; Hole punches Staple removers Paper cutters
- Parent: ACCO Brands
- Website: https://www.swingline.com/

Swingline is a division of ACCO Brands Corporation that specializes in manufacturing staplers and hole punches. From its foundation in 1925, the company was located in Long Island City, Queens, New York City, United States, until the plant was moved to Nogales, Mexico, in 1999.

== History ==
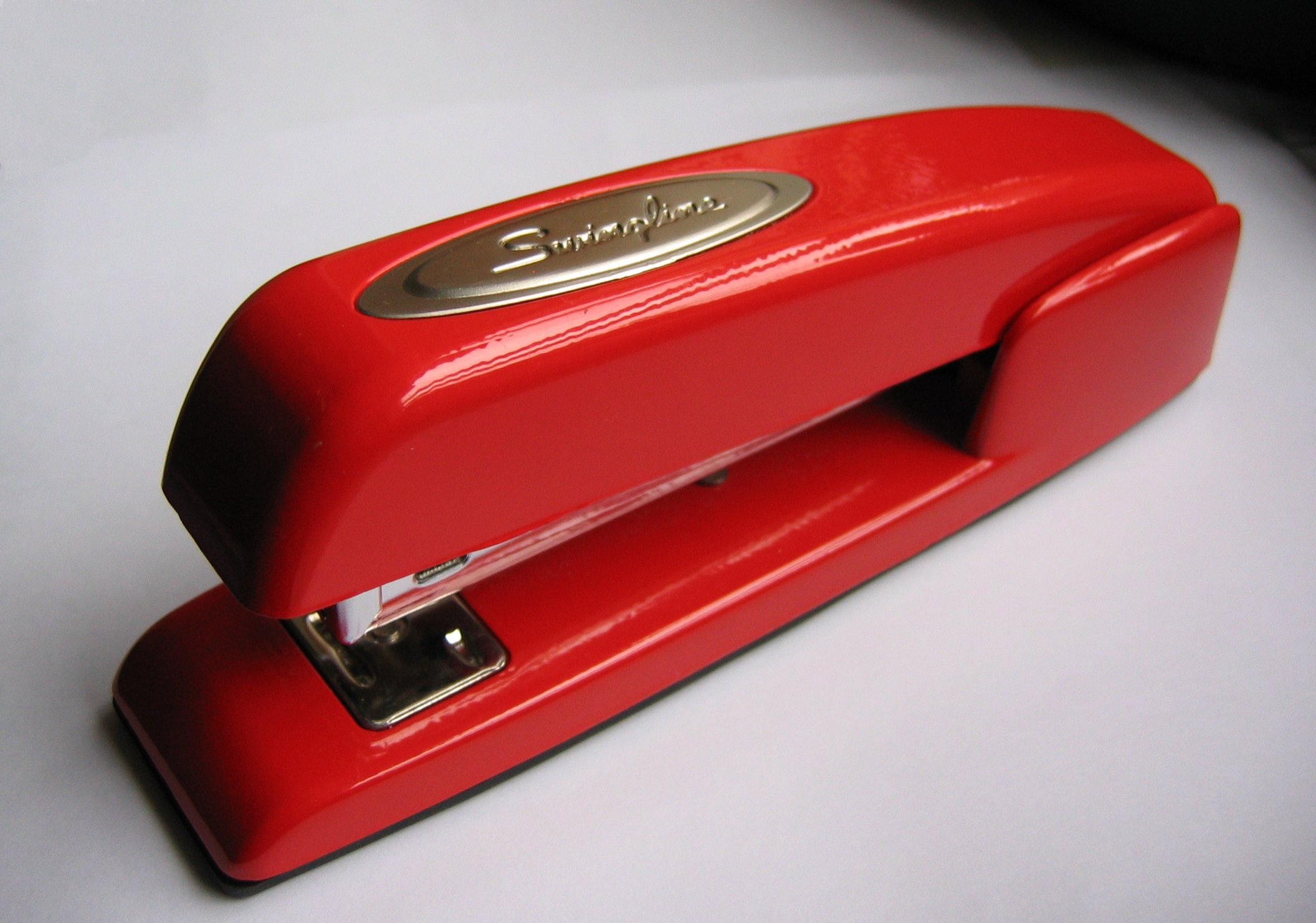
The Swingline 747 Rio Red

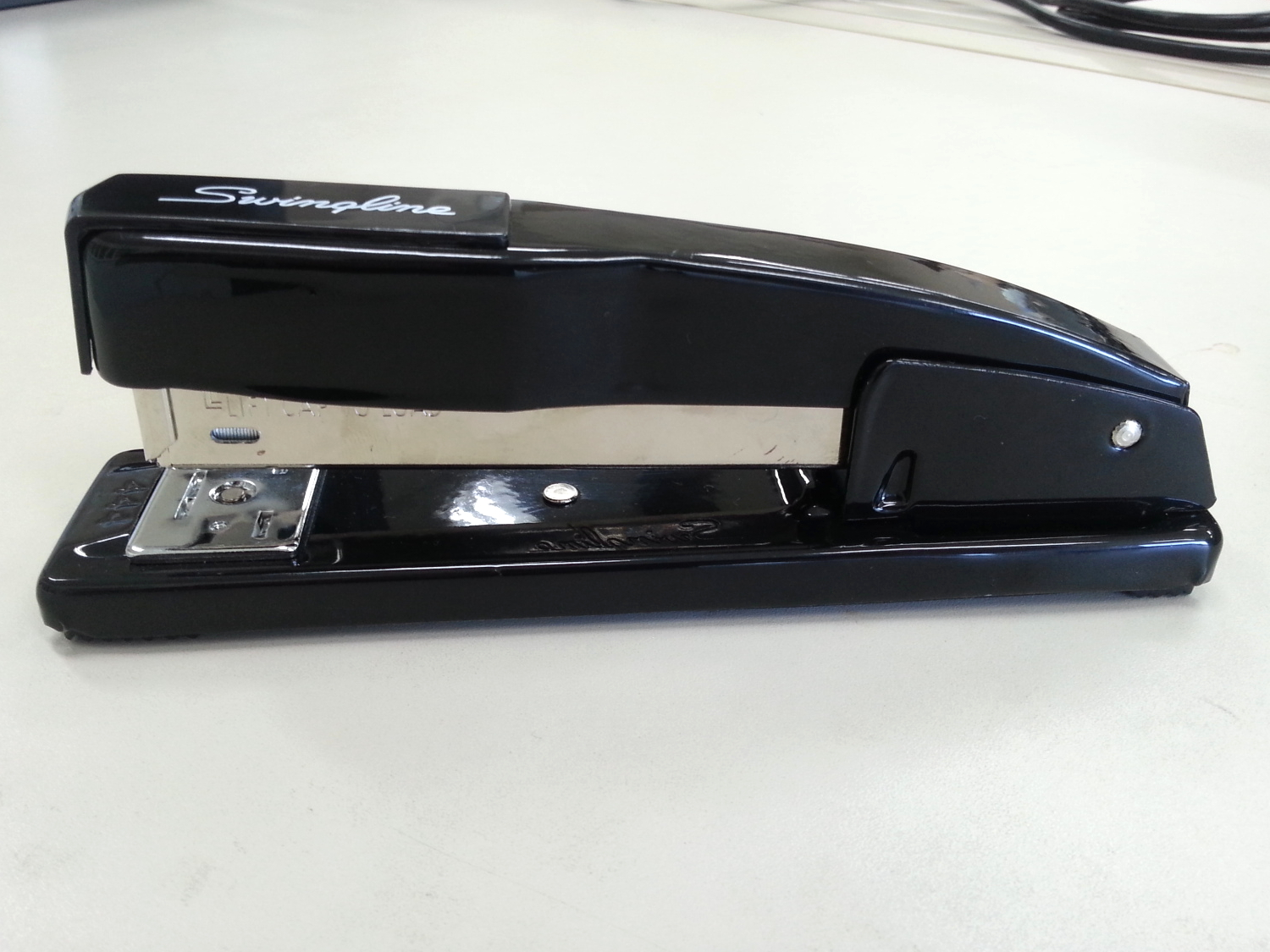
The Swingline Commercial Desk Stapler

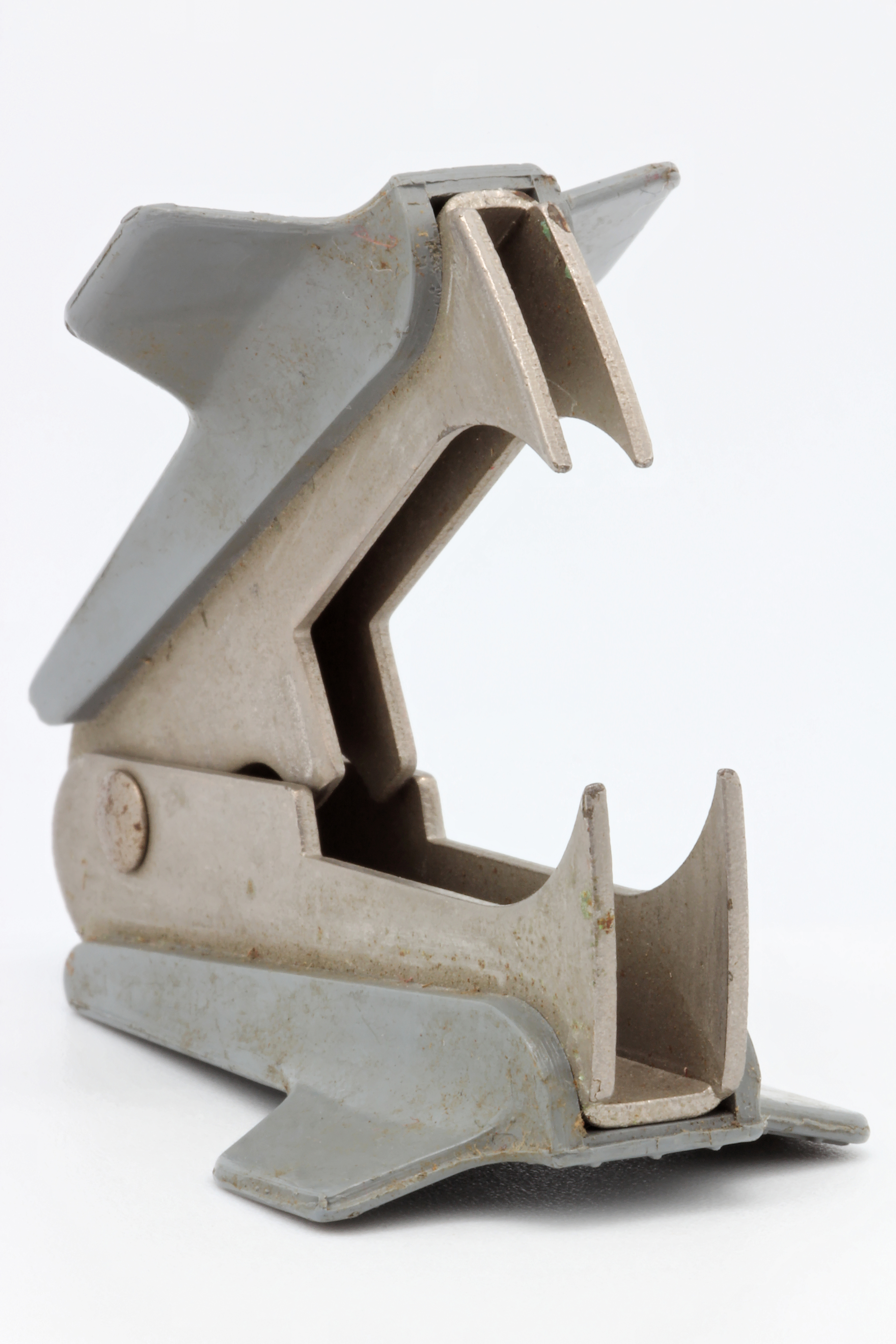
A staple remover

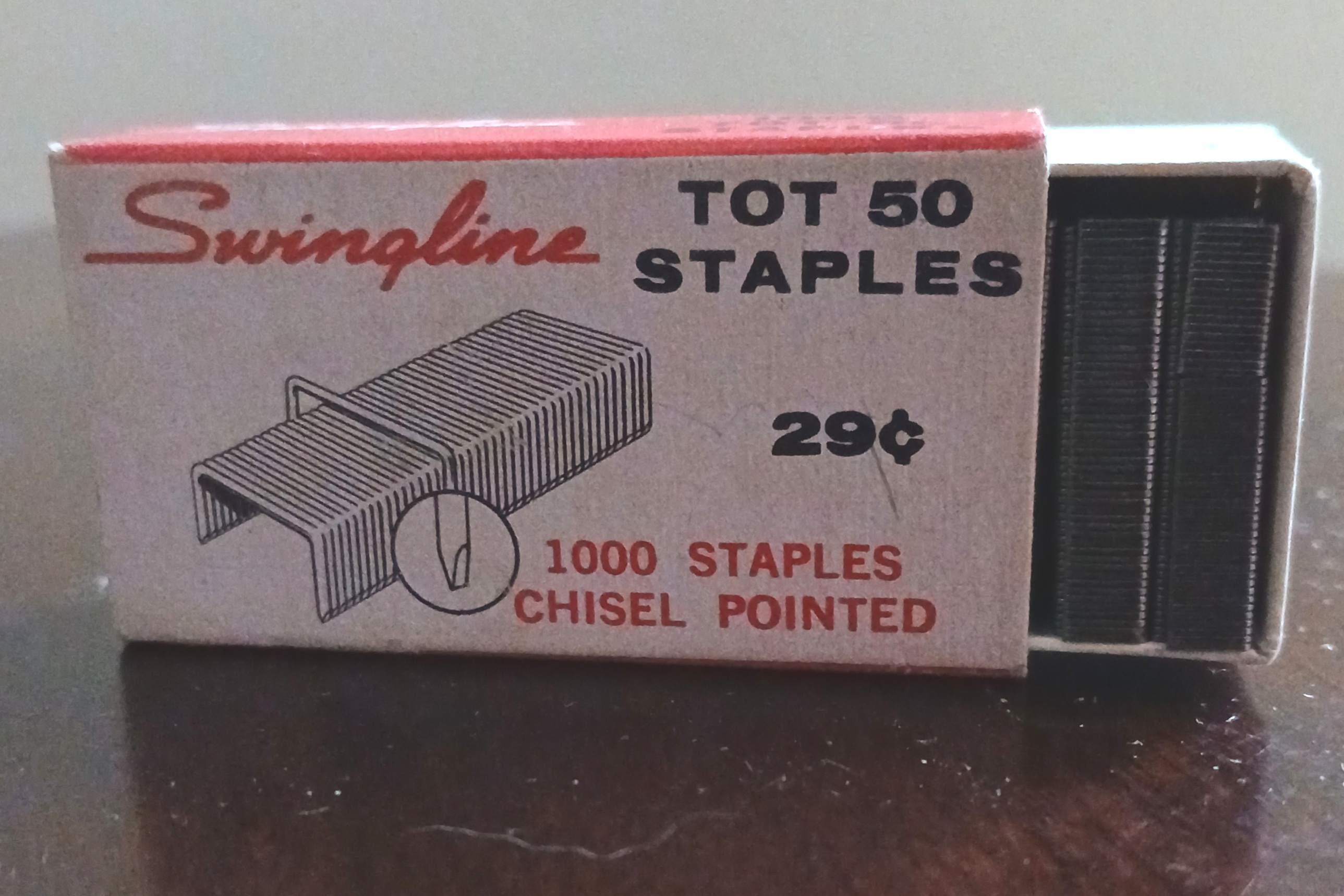
1970s box of Swingline TOT 50 chisel-pointed staples, priced at 29 cents.

Swingline was founded in 1925 in New York City by Jack Linsky. At that time, it was known as the Parrot Speed Fastener Company and opened its first manufacturing facilities on Varick Street, and in Long Island City in 1931. Eight years later the company changed its name to Speed Products and created the first top-opening stapler, allowing easy refilling of a full strip of staples. The design of this stapler, called the "Swingline" in 1935, eventually became the industry standard. In 1956 the company was renamed Swingline, and in 1968 introduced the Swingline 747, their most popular model yet. It was then sold to American Brands for $210 million in 1970. At the time of the sale, Jack Linsky was president and chairman and his wife Belle Linsky was treasurer. They owned 19 percent of the stock. Swingline became a division of ACCO, under Fortune Brands, in 1987.

For decades, the Swingline sign on the Long Island City building, measuring 60 feet high and 50 feet wide, became a local landmark visible to travelers on highways and trains between Manhattan and Long Island.

In 1999, Acco closed Swingline's Long Island City plant, which it had occupied for fifty years, and moved production to Nogales, Mexico. About 450 workers lost their jobs. At the time, it was the largest single job loss in the city caused by the North American Free Trade Agreement. When the closing was announced in 1997, Acco was criticized by New York's mayor, Rudy Giuliani, who said the city could do without a company that did not want to pay workers an adequate wage.

A custom-painted red Swingline 646 stapler was prominently featured in the 1999 comedy movie Office Space. In 2002, Swingline introduced an official red model (only this time a model 747), in response to an increased demand from fans of the film.

== Management ==
The company's founder and longtime president, Jack Linsky, was born to a Jewish family in northern Russia, one of seven children. His father Zus was a fabric peddler. Preceded by Zus, the family emigrated to New York's Lower East Side in 1904. He found work at a stationery store at the age of 14, and by 17 he was a salesman. He then launched his own wholesale business, Jaclin Stationery, which imported German-made staplers. A trip to Europe in the 1920s inspired Linsky to create an "open channel" stapler not requiring a screwdriver to open to insert staples.

Linsky's wife Belle Linsky, who was born in Kyiv, became an avid art collector along with her husband.
