= Samuel Slocum =

American inventor (1792–1861)

Samuel Slocum (March 4, 1792 – January 26, 1861) was an American inventor from Poughkeepsie, New York.

He was born in Jamestown, Rhode Island, son of Peleg Slocum and Anne Dyer Slocum, and raised in Usquepaugh, a village in South Kingstown, where William Lockwood first invented the common pin with a head to keep it from slipping through cloth sometime after 1772. The sixth of eight children, he worked as a carpenter before he decided to move to London and become a pin maker. These pins later became flat head pins (similar to staples).

A short time later he moved back to the United States to Poughkeepsie and formed a pin manufacturing company, Slocum and Jillion, which invented a "Machine for Sticking Pins into Paper", which is often believed to be the first stapler. In fact, this patent from September 30, 1841, Patent #2275, is for a device used for packaging pins.

He married Susan Stanton Slocum in 1817 in Richmond, Rhode Island, and had three children, Samuel Dyer Slocum, Mary Slocum, and John Stanton Slocum.
