= Jack and Belle Linsky Collection =

Art collection

The Jack and Belle Linsky Collection is a group of over 380 European works of art, including 229 18th-century porcelain sculptures, amassed over forty years and donated to The Metropolitan Museum of Art by Belle Linsky in 1982, after the death of her husband, Jack, in 1980. Before it was given to the Met, the collection was under the purview of The Jack and Belle Linsky Foundation. At the time, the collection was valued at $60 million. The Met subsequently installed The Jack and Belle Linsky Galleries, which opened to the public in June 1984.

== Catalog ==
The collection was cataloged in The Jack and Belle Linsky Collection in The Metropolitan Museum of Art (1984).
