= The Virgin with the laughing Child =

15th-century sculpture

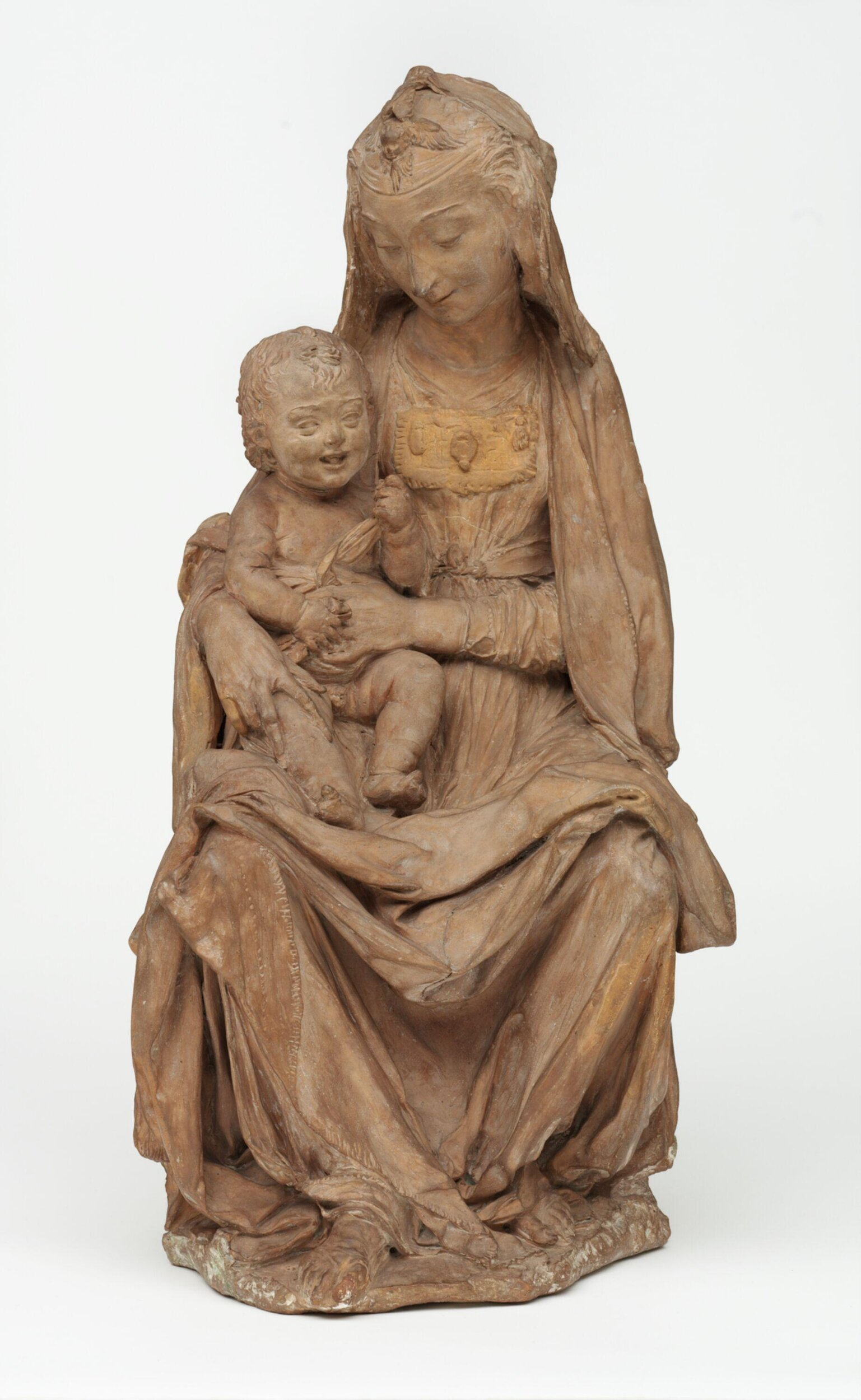
The Virgin and the laughing Child, Leonardo da Vinci, from Victoria and Albert Museum, London

The Virgin and Laughing Child, also called The Virgin with the laughing Child, or generally abbreviated as another of many depictions of the Virgin and Child, is a statuette originating in Florence and was made circa 1460. It is a terracotta figure of the Virgin Mary carrying the laughing child Jesus Christ. It has been attributed to Leonardo da Vinci as "the artist's only surviving sculpture". It was credited to the Renaissance artist and inventor by curators at a Florence exhibit in 2019, claiming that this was a student artwork submitted under da Vinci's master and teacher, Andrea del Verrocchio at age 19 or 20. It is currently on display at the Victoria and Albert Museum in London, where it has been since 1858.

== Authorship ==
The authorship of this sculpture has been disputed. Originally, speculations about the artists surrounded artists such as Antonio Rossellino, Andrea del Verrocchio, and Desiderio da Settignano. The most supported theory was that the artist responsible for the small sculpture was Rossellino, which was also the officially stated author by the Victoria and Albert Museum. But in 2019, when this sculpture was brought to its hometown in Florence for an exhibition, scholars made the reattribution to da Vinci. The leading scholar on this movement, Francesco Caglioti, began by showing the lack of proof provided by those who claimed the sculpture was a work of Rossellino, such as art historian John Pope-Hennessy. After thorough investigation, Caglioti and other scholars found parallels between the style of the Virgin with the laughing Child, and techniques found in art of da Vinci's mentor, Verrocchio, but with a few stylistic differences. Verrocchio's obvious influence lead to speculation that a student of his hand created this statuette. The depiction of a smiling Virgin Mary, and the "whim" of the sculpture are recognizable traits found in da Vinci's work, marking him as a likely candidate. Some point out that the artist had not mastered the art of facial sculpture, specifically of the nose, furthermore clarifying the "student-piece" theory.

Carmen C Bambach, New York's Leonardo da Vinci expert of the Metropolitan Museum of Art, supported the reattribution, by pointing out the striking similarities between the drapery sculpted into the Virgin with the Laughing Child and the drawings made by Leonardo as a student, as well as the similarities between this portrayal of the young Christ and the sketches in the artist's notebook.

Currently, the Victoria and Albert Museum states that they "are not certain who modelled it" as opposed to confidently affirming the reattribution to Leonardo da Vinci.
