= Una Pope-Hennessy =

British biographer and historian

Dame Una Pope-Hennessy DBE
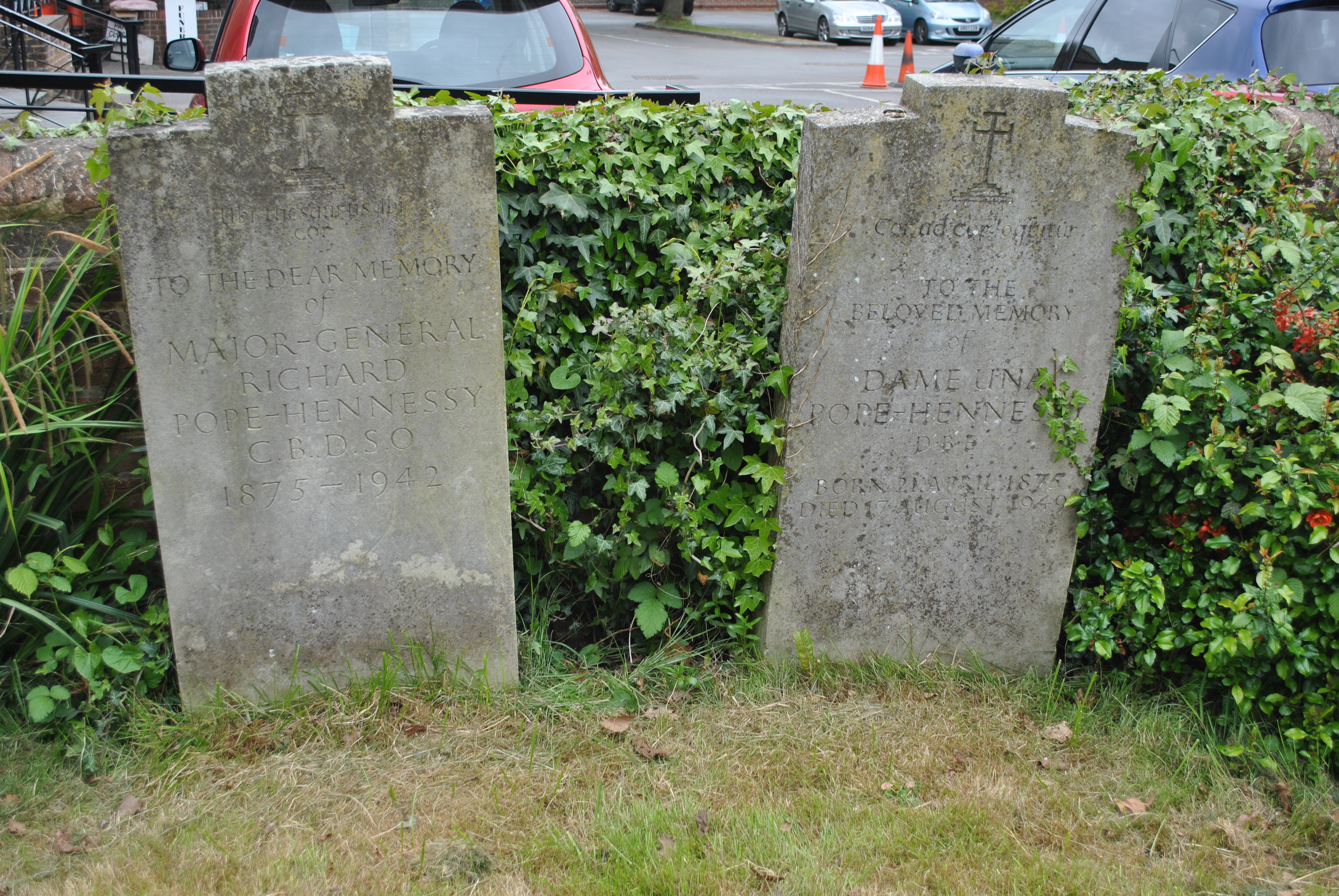
- Grave in the Friary Churchyard of St Francis and St Anthony, Crawley, 2017
- Born: Una Constance Birch; 21 April 1875
- Died: 16 August 1949 (aged 74)
- Occupations: Writer, historian, biographer

Dame Una Constance Pope-Hennessy, DBE (née Birch; 21 April 1875 – 16 August 1949) was a British writer, historian, and biographer. She was the daughter of Sir Arthur Birch, and married Major (later Major-General) Richard Pope-Hennessy in 1910.

During the First World War, she was a member of the Central Prisoners of War Committee. For this work, she was appointed Dame Commander of the Order of the British Empire (DBE) in the 1920 civilian war honours. Her two sons were both notable in their own right: James Pope-Hennessy was a writer and Sir John Pope-Hennessy an art historian.

She died in 1949 and is buried alongside her husband at Friary Church of St Francis and St Anthony, Crawley.

== Writings ==
Pope-Hennessy's early published works were historical studies of jades and secret societies. Her first biographies were on Anna Van Schurman and Madame Roland. In 1929 she published Three English Women in America, charting American experience of Frances Trollope, Fanny Kemble and Harriet Martineau. It became one of her best known works, and so did her biographical study of Edgar Allan Poe, published in 1934. Other widely read biographies followed. In 1940 she published a biography of Agnes Strickland, and the exhaustive biography of Charles Dickens was published in 1945.

In 1938 Pope-Hennessy published an account of her visit to Leningrad during the Stalin reign in The Closed City. Her final two books were translations, A Czarina's Story and Canon Charles Kingsley both published in 1948 a year before her death.

== Selected bibliography ==
Pope-Hennessy's books, usually published as Una Birch, included:

- Maxims of a Queen (1907; writings of Queen Christina of Sweden, selected and translated by Birch)
- Anna van Schurman: Artist, Scholar, Saint (1909)
- Secret Societies and the French Revolution (1911; still in print as James Wassermann (ed.): Secret Societies: Illuminati, Freemasons and the French Revolution. Nicolas Hayes, 2007, ISBN 978-0892541324)
- Madame Roland: A Study in Revolution (1917)
- Early Chinese Jades (1923; about Chinese jade figurines, which she collected)
- Three English Women in America (1929; about Fanny Trollope, Fanny Kemble and Harriet Martineau)
- The Aristocratic Journey (1931; the edited letters of Margaret Hall in the United States, 1827–1828)
- The Laird of Abbotsford: An Informal Presentation of Sir Walter Scott (1932)
- Edgar Allan Poe, 1809–1849: A Critical Biography (1934)
- The Closed City: Impressions of a Visit to Leningrad (1938; she had visited in 1937)
- Agnes Strickland: Biographer of the Queens of England (1940)
- Durham Company (1941; about the literary associations of County Durham)
- Charles Dickens (1945)
- A Jade Miscellany (1946)
- Sir Walter Scott (1948)
- A Czarina's Story (1948; by Tsarina Alexandra of Russia; translated and edited by Pope-Hennessy)
- Canon Charles Kingsley (1948)
