= Hans Wild =

British photographer (1912–1969)

Hans Wild (1912–1969) was a British photographer who worked for Life magazine from 1938 to 1946. Some of his best known work appeared on the cover of Life including a photo of historian Charles Seltman in 1943 and British Prime Minister Winston Churchill while painting with an easel in 1946.

Wild became a professional photographer at 24 years old in 1936, and worked for Life in various capacities in the United States, England, France and Italy. He took numerous photos documenting World War II, as well as portraits of famous people including John Cage, Merce Cunningham, Vivien Leigh, Mary Welsh Hemingway, Bing Crosby, actress Pat Kirkwood, the painter Thomas Hart Benton, E. V. Knox editor of Punch, Foreign Secretary Anthony Eden, Rupert Neve, fashion designer Elsa Schiaparelli, Laurence Olivier, Daphne du Maurier, C. S. Lewis, Alexander Fleming, Chinese Ambassador Guo Taiqi, Nancy Astor, Viscountess Astor, Benjamin Britten, Louis Mountbatten, 1st Earl Mountbatten of Burma, and American diplomats Jefferson Caffery and Anthony Joseph Drexel Biddle, Jr., Louis II, Prince of Monaco with Ghislaine Dommanget and Rainier III, Robert Anthony Eden, David Lloyd George, Thomas Beecham.

During his career Wild took many photos of ordinary life and common people of particular artistic and historic documental relevance such as shots of Londoners sleeping in the London Underground during World War II bombing raids in 1940. He also participated in the production and development of photographs of D-Day with Robert Capa.

After the war, Wild returned to London and opened his own studio in Chelsea specialising in fashion and theatre, and works for the textile industry. His dance photographs appeared in Richard Buckle's Ballet magazine.
