= Hammer =

Type of hand tool

A modern claw hammer suited to drive and remove nails

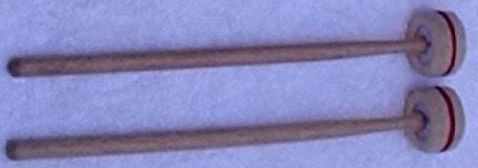
Cartwheel mallets with heads of felt held between steel washers for use with timpani drums

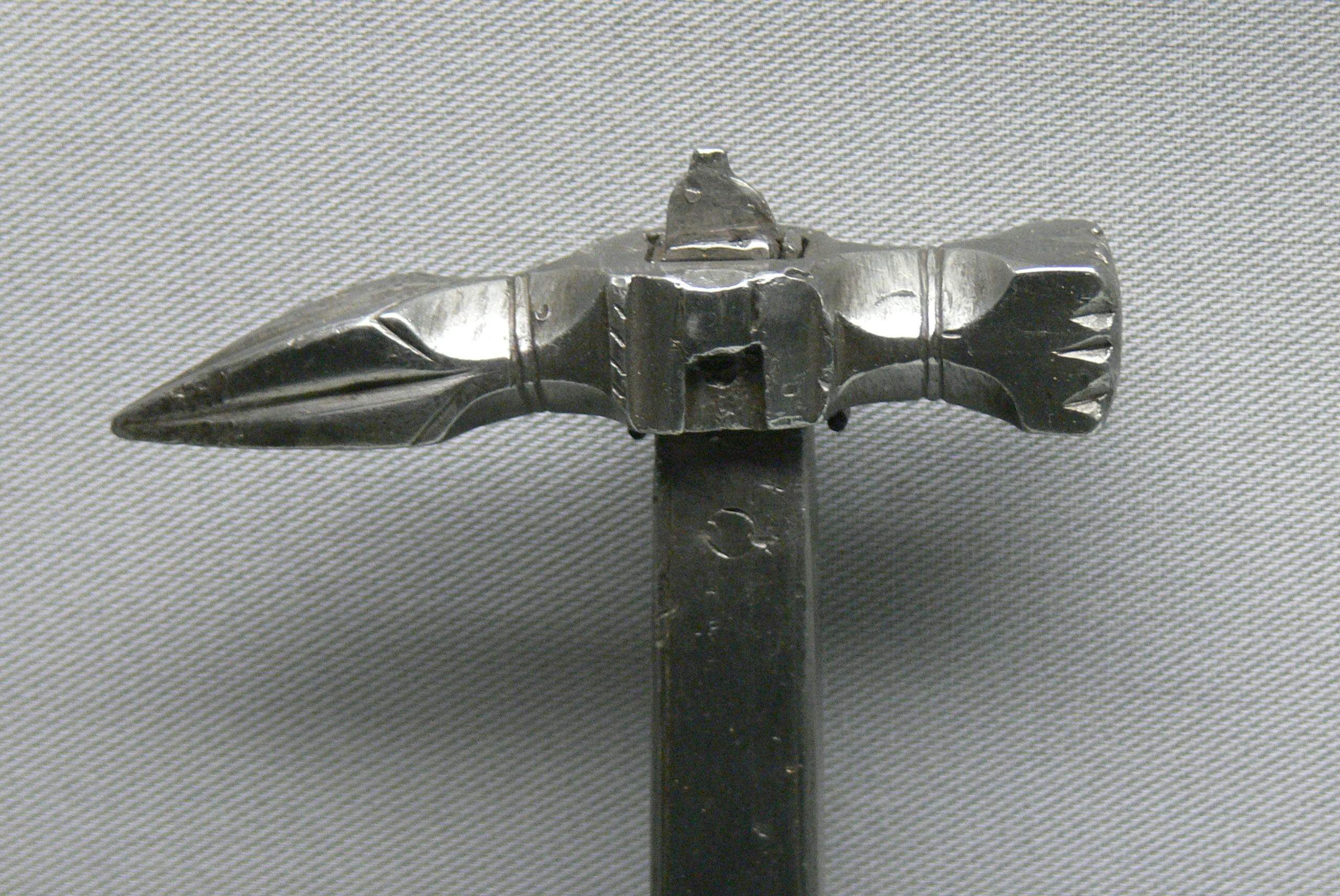
Detail of the head of a war hammer

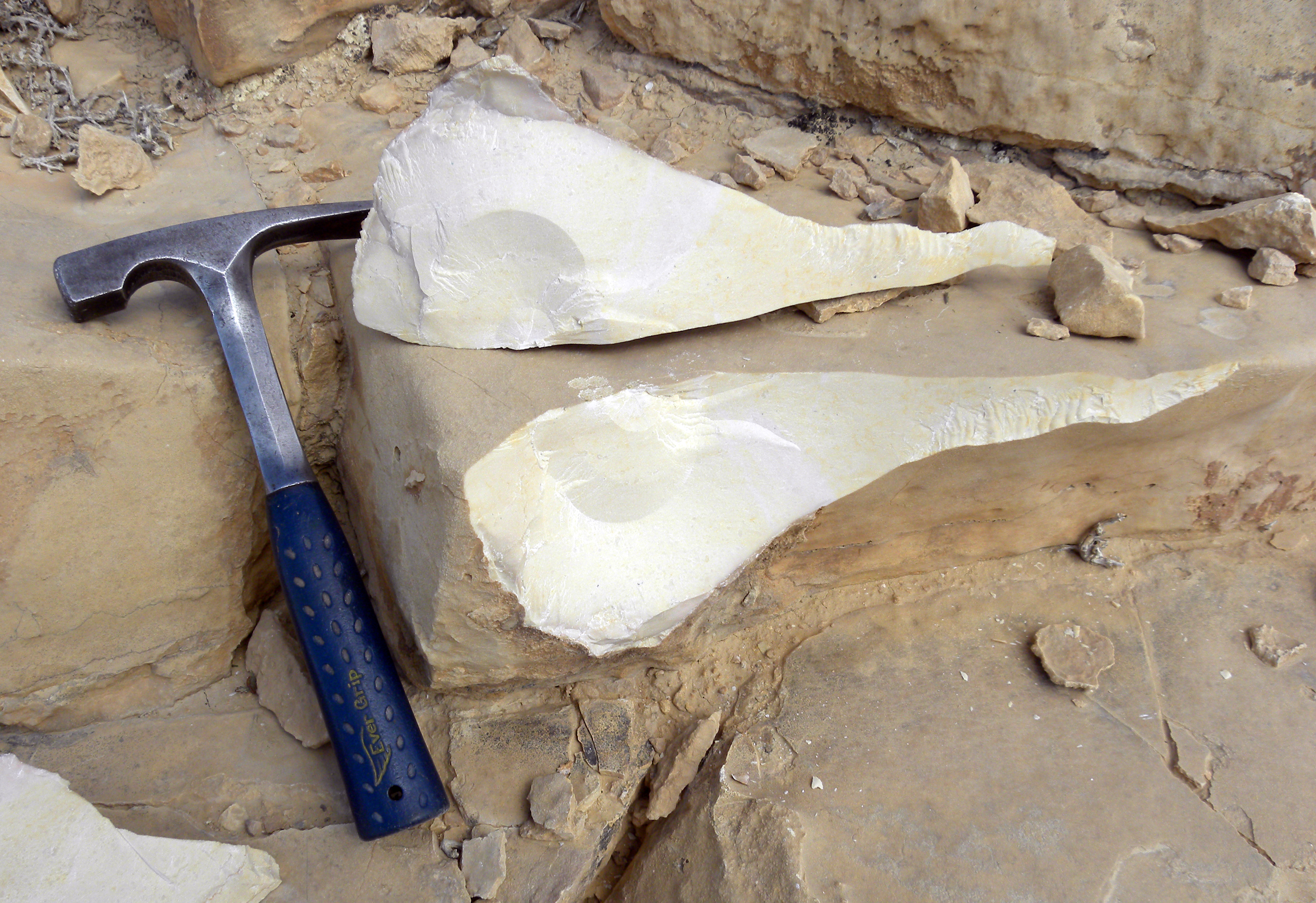
A geologist's hammer used to break up rocks, as seen in archaeology and prospecting

A hammer is a tool, most often a hand tool, consisting of a weighted "head" fixed to a long handle that is swung to deliver an impact to an object. This can be used to drive nails into wood, to shape metal (as with a forge), or to crush rock. Hammers are used for a wide range of driving, shaping, breaking, and non-destructive striking applications. Traditional disciplines include carpentry, blacksmithing, warfare, and percussive musicianship (as with a gong).

The modern hammer head is typically made of steel which has been heat treated for hardness, and the handle (also known as a haft or helve) is typically made of wood or plastic.

Ubiquitous in framing, the claw hammer has a "claw" to pull nails out of wood, and is commonly found in an inventory of household tools in North America. Other types of hammers vary in shape, size, and structure, depending on their purposes. Hammers used in many trades include sledgehammers, mallets, and ball-peen hammers. Although most hammers are hand tools, powered hammers, such as steam hammers and trip hammers, are used to deliver forces beyond the capacity of the human arm. There are over 40 different types of hammers that have many different types of uses.

The high elasticity of the steel head is important in energy transfer, especially when used in conjunction with an equally elastic anvil.

In terms of human physiology, many uses of the hammer involve coordinated ballistic movements under intense muscular forces which must be planned in advance at the neuromuscular level, as they occur too rapidly for conscious adjustment in flight. For this reason, accurate striking at speed requires more practice than a tapping movement to the same target area. It has been suggested that the cognitive demands for pre-planning, sequencing and accurate timing associated with the related ballistic movements of throwing, clubbing, and hammering precipitated aspects of brain evolution in early hominids.

== History ==
The use of simple hammers dates to around 3.3 million years ago; in 2012, Sonia Harmand and Jason Lewis of Stony Brook University, while excavating a site near Kenya's Lake Turkana, discovered a very large deposit of variously shaped stones including those used to strike wood, bone, or other stones to break them apart and shape them. The first hammers were made without handles. Stones attached to sticks with strips of leather or animal sinew were being used as hammers with handles by about 30,000 BCE during the middle of the Paleolithic Stone Age. The addition of a handle gave the user better control and less accidents. The hammer became the primary tool used for building, food, and protection.

The hammer's archaeological record shows that it may be the oldest tool for which definite evidence exists.

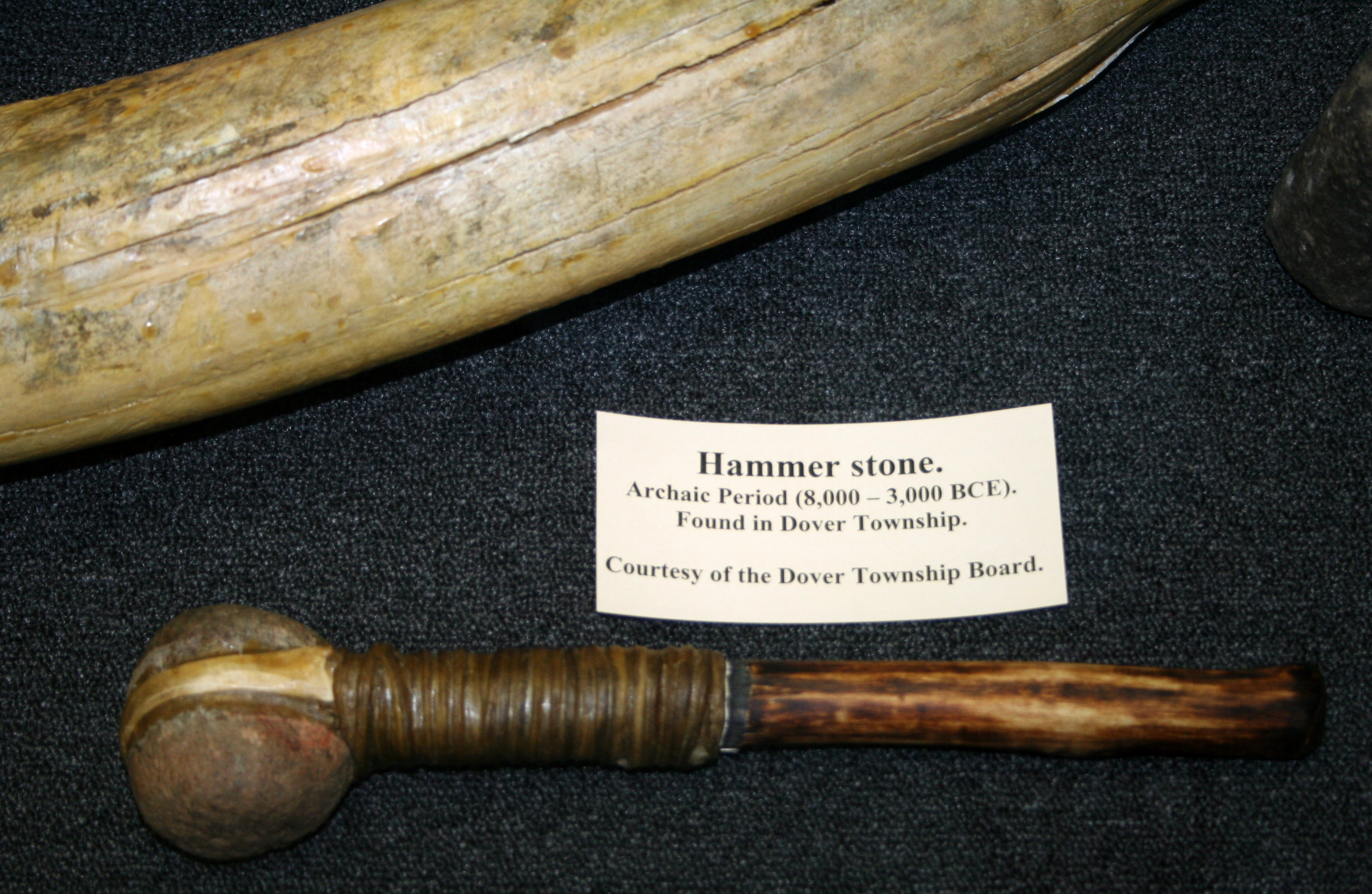
A stone hammer found in Dover Township, Minnesota dated to 8000–3000 BCE, the North American Archaic period

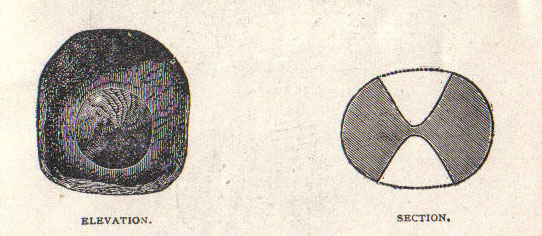
Stone tapping hammer

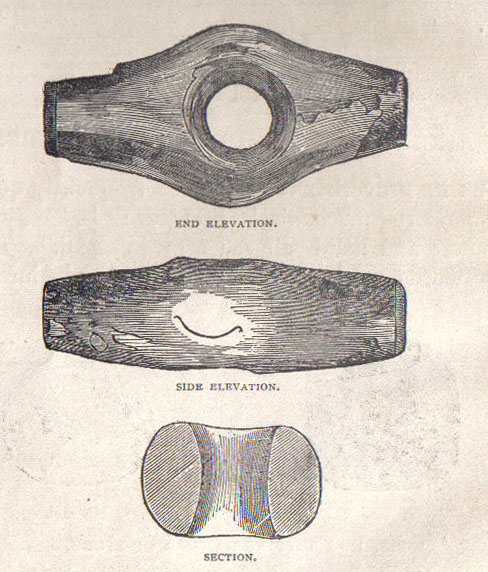
Perforated hammer head of stone

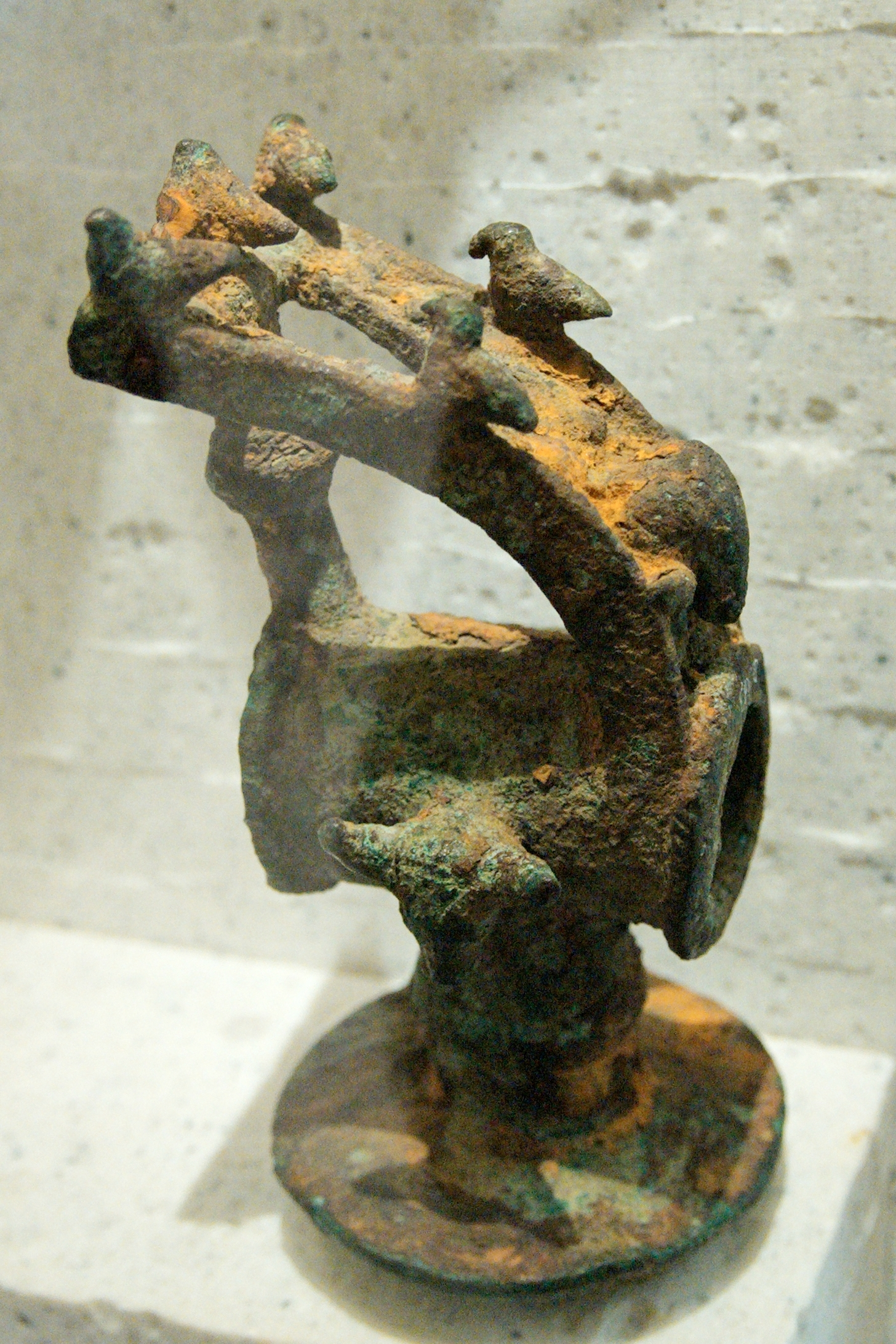
Ancient Greek bronze sacrificial hammer, 7th century BCE, from Dodona

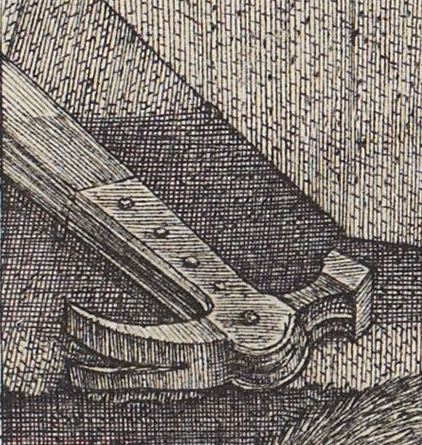
16th-century claw hammer; detail from Dürer's Melencolia I (c. 1514)

== Construction and materials ==
A traditional hand-held hammer consists of a separate head and a handle, which can be fastened together by means of a special wedge made for the purpose or by glue. This two-piece design is often used to combine a dense metallic striking head with a non-metallic mechanical-shock-absorbing handle (to reduce user fatigue from repeated strikes). If wood is used for the handle, it is often hickory or ash, which are tough and long-lasting materials that can dissipate shock waves from the hammer head. Rigid fiberglass resin may be used for the handle; this material does not absorb water or decay but does not dissipate shock as well as wood.

A loose hammer head is considered hazardous due to the risk of the head becoming detached from the handle while being swung becoming a dangerous uncontrolled projectile. Wooden handles can often be replaced when worn or damaged; specialized kits are available covering a range of handle sizes and designs, plus special wedges and spacers for secure attachment.

Some hammers are one-piece designs made mostly of a single material. A one-piece metallic hammer may optionally have its handle coated or wrapped in a resilient material such as rubber for improved grip and to reduce user fatigue.

The hammer head may be surfaced with a variety of materials including brass, bronze, wood, plastic, rubber, or leather. Some hammers have interchangeable striking surfaces, which can be selected as needed or replaced when worn out.

== Designs and variations ==
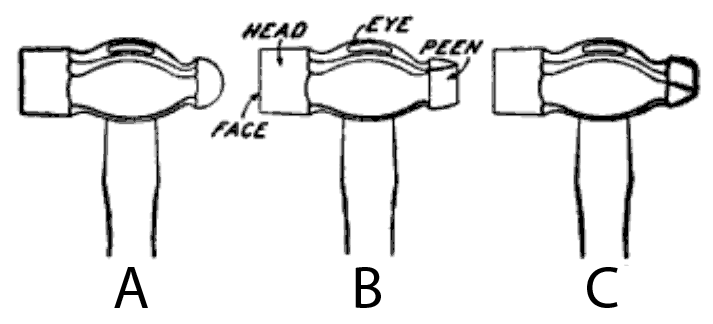
The parts of a hammer are the face, head (includes the bell and neck, which are not labeled), eye (where the handle fits into), peen (also spelled pein and pane). The side of a hammer is the cheek and some hammers have straps that extend down the handle for strength. Shown here are: A. Ball-peen hammer B. Straight-peen hammer C. Cross-peen hammer

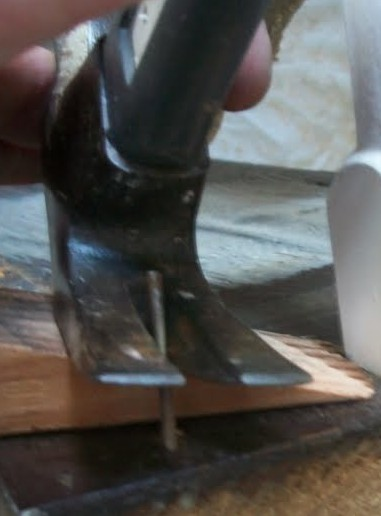
The claw of a carpenter's hammer is frequently used to remove nails.

A large hammer-like tool is a maul (sometimes called a "beetle"), a wood- or rubber-headed hammer is a mallet, and a hammer-like tool with a cutting blade is usually called a hatchet. The essential part of a hammer is the head, a compact solid mass that is able to deliver a blow to the intended target without itself deforming. The impacting surface of the tool is usually flat or slightly rounded; the opposite end of the impacting mass may have a ball shape, as in the ball-peen hammer. Some upholstery hammers have a magnetized face, to pick up tacks. In the hatchet, the flat hammer head may be secondary to the cutting edge of the tool.

The impact between steel hammer heads and the objects being hit can create sparks, which may ignite flammable or explosive gases. These are a hazard in some industries such as underground coal mining (due to the presence of methane gas), or in other hazardous environments such as petroleum refineries and chemical plants. In these environments, a variety of non-sparking metal tools are used, primarily made of aluminium or beryllium copper. In recent years, the handles have been made of durable plastic or rubber, though wood is still widely used because of its shock-absorbing qualities and repairability.

=== Small hand-powered ===
- Ball-peen hammer, or mechanic's hammer
- Boiler scaling hammer
- Brass hammer, also known as non-sparking hammer or spark-proof hammer and used mainly in flammable areas like oil fields
- Bricklayer's hammer
- Carpenter's hammer (used for nailing), such as the framing hammer and the claw hammer, and pinhammers (ball-peen and cross-peen types)
- Cow hammer – sometimes used for livestock slaughter, a practice now deprecated due to animal welfare objections
- Cross-peen hammer, having one round face and one wedge-peen face.
- Dead blow hammer delivers impact with very little recoil, often due to a hollow head filled with sand, lead shot or pellets
- Drilling hammer – a short handled sledgehammer originally used for drilling in rock with a chisel. The name usually refers to a hammer with a 2-to-4-pound (0.91 to 1.81 kg) head and a 10-inch (250 mm) handle, also called a "single-jack" hammer because it was used by one person drilling, holding the chisel in one hand and the hammer in the other. In modern usage, the term is mostly interchangeable with "engineer's hammer", although it can indicate a version with a slightly shorter handle.
- Engineer's hammer, a short-handled hammer, was originally an essential components of a railroad engineer's toolkit for working on steam locomotives. Typical weight is 2–4 lbs (0.9–1.8 kg) with a 12–14-inch (30–35 cm) handle. Originally these were often cross-peen hammers, with one round face and one wedge-peen face, but in modern usage the term primarily refers to hammers with two round faces.
- Gavel, used by judges and presiding authorities to draw attention
- Geologist's hammer or rock pick
- Joiner's hammer, or Warrington hammer
- Knife-edged hammer, its properties developed to aid a hammerer in the act of slicing whilst bludgeoning
- Lathe hammer (also known as a lath hammer, lathing hammer, or lathing hatchet), a tool used for cutting and nailing wood lath, which has a small hatchet blade on one side (with a small, lateral nick for pulling nails) and a hammer head on the other
- Lump hammer, or club hammer
- Mallets, including versions made with hard rubber or rolled sheets of rawhide
- Magnetic double-head hammer
- Magnetic tack hammer
- Rock climbing hammer
- Rounding hammer, Blacksmith or farrier hammer. Round face generally for moving or drawing metal and flat for "planishing" or smoothing out the surface marks.
- Shingler's hammer
- Soft-faced hammer
- Strike Tack hammer
- Stonemason's hammer
- Tinner's hammer
- Upholstery hammer
- Welder's chipping hammer

=== Large hand-powered ===
These hammers are typically wielded with two hands rather than one hand.

- Maul used as a war hammer
- Post maul, a type of sledgehammer used to drive fence posts
- Railway track keying hammer
- Sledgehammer
- Spike maul or spiking hammer, used to drive railroad spikes
- Splitting maul, used for splitting wood

=== Powered hammers ===
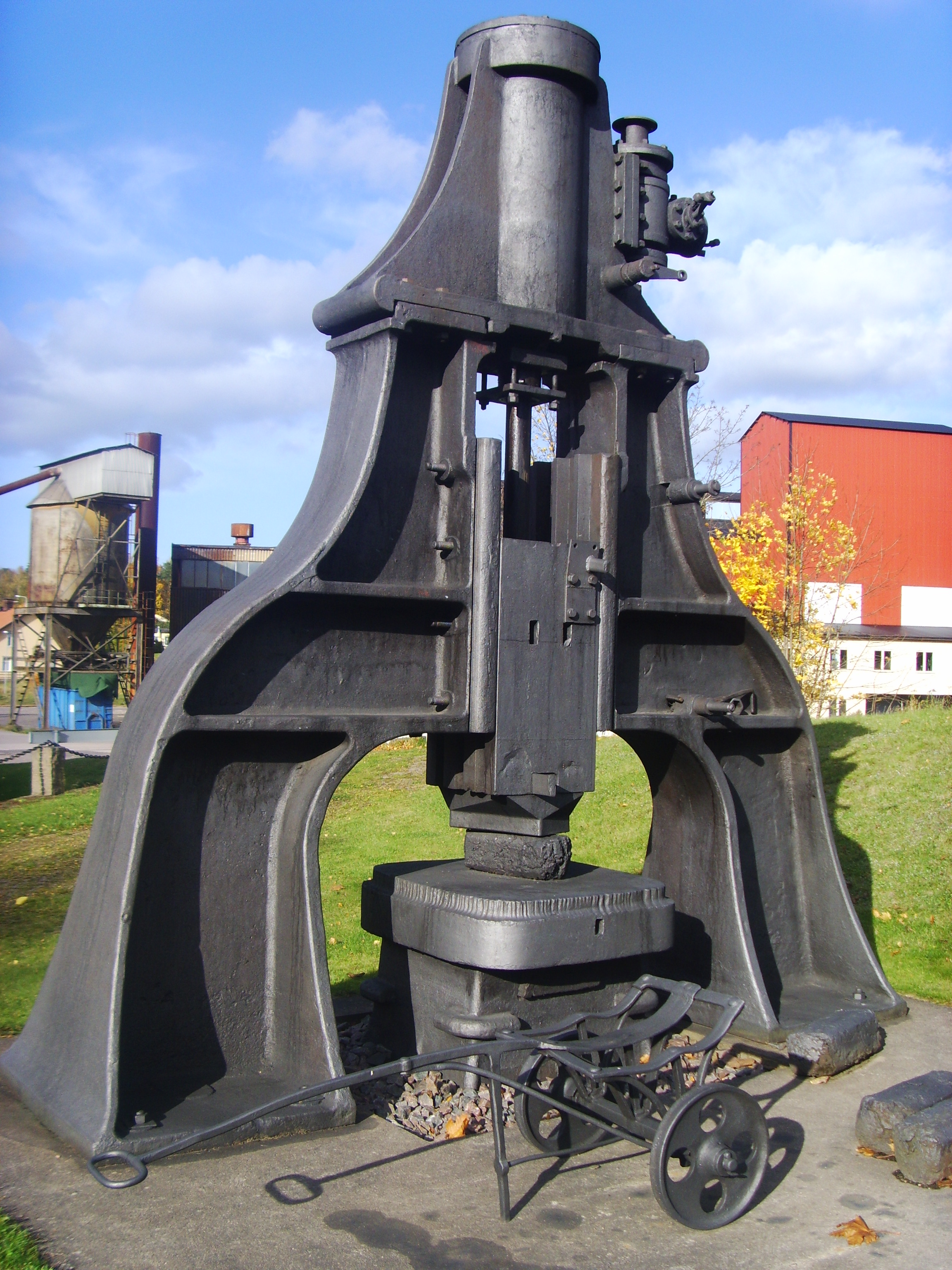
Steam hammer

Powered hammers often look quite different from the hand tools, but most work on the same principle. They include:

- Demolition hammer, typically a powered hand tool
- Hammer drill, that combines a jackhammer-like mechanism with a drill
- High Frequency Impact Treatment hammer – for after-treatment of weld transitions
- Jackhammer
- Nail gun
- Staple gun
- Steam hammer
- Trip hammer

== Associated tools ==
- Anvil
- Chisel
- Pipe drift (Blacksmithing – spreading a punched hole to proper size or shape)
- Punch
- Star drill
- Woodsplitting maul – can be used as a woodsplitting wedge by hitting with a sledgehammer
- Woodsplitting wedge – hit with a sledgehammer for splitting wood

== Physics ==
=== As a force amplifier ===
A hammer is a simple force amplifier that works by converting mechanical work into kinetic energy and back.

In the swing that precedes each blow, the hammer head stores a certain amount of kinetic energy—equal to the length D of the swing times the force f produced by the muscles of the arm and by gravity. When the hammer strikes, the head is stopped by an opposite force coming from the target, equal and opposite to the force applied by the head to the target. If the target is a hard and heavy object, or if it is resting on some sort of anvil, the head can travel only a very short distance d before stopping. Since the stopping force F times that distance must be equal to the head's kinetic energy, it follows that F is much greater than the original driving force f—roughly, by a factor D/d. In this way, great strength is not needed to produce a force strong enough to bend steel, or crack the hardest stone.

=== Effect of the head's mass ===
The amount of energy delivered to the target by the hammer-blow is equivalent to one half the mass of the head times the square of the head's speed at the time of impact $(E={mv^2 \over 2})$. While the energy delivered to the target increases linearly with mass, it increases quadratically with the speed (see the effect of the handle, below). High tech titanium heads are lighter and allow for longer handles, thus increasing velocity and delivering the same energy with less arm fatigue than that of a heavier steel head hammer. A titanium head has about 3% recoil energy and can result in greater efficiency and less fatigue when compared to a steel head with up to 30% recoil. Dead blow hammers use special rubber or steel shot to absorb recoil energy, rather than bouncing the hammer head after impact.

=== Effect of the handle ===
The handle of the hammer helps in several ways. It keeps the user's hands away from the point of impact. It provides a broad area that is better-suited for gripping by the hand. Most importantly, it allows the user to maximize the speed of the head on each blow. The primary constraint on additional handle length is the lack of space to swing the hammer. This is why sledgehammers, largely used in open spaces, can have handles that are much longer than a standard carpenter's hammer. The second most important constraint is more subtle. Even without considering the effects of fatigue, the longer the handle, the harder it is to guide the head of the hammer to its target at full speed.

Most designs are a compromise between practicality and energy efficiency. With too long a handle, the hammer is inefficient because it delivers force to the wrong place, off-target. With too short a handle, the hammer is inefficient because it does not deliver enough force, requiring more blows to complete a given task. Modifications have also been made with respect to the effect of the hammer on the user. Handles made of shock-absorbing materials or varying angles attempt to make it easier for the user to continue to wield this age-old device, even as nail guns and other powered drivers encroach on its traditional field of use.

As hammers must be used in many circumstances, where the position of the person using them cannot be taken for granted, trade-offs are made for the sake of practicality. In areas where one has plenty of room, a long handle with a heavy head (like a sledgehammer) can deliver the maximum amount of energy to the target. It is not practical to use such a large hammer for all tasks, however, and thus the overall design has been modified repeatedly to achieve the optimum utility in a wide variety of situations.

=== Effect of gravity ===
Gravity exerts a force on the hammer head. If hammering downward, gravity increases the acceleration during the hammer stroke and increases the energy delivered with each blow. If hammering upwards, gravity reduces the acceleration during the hammer stroke and therefore reduces the energy delivered with each blow. Some hammering methods, such as traditional mechanical pile drivers, rely entirely on gravity for acceleration on the down stroke.

== Ergonomics and injury risks ==
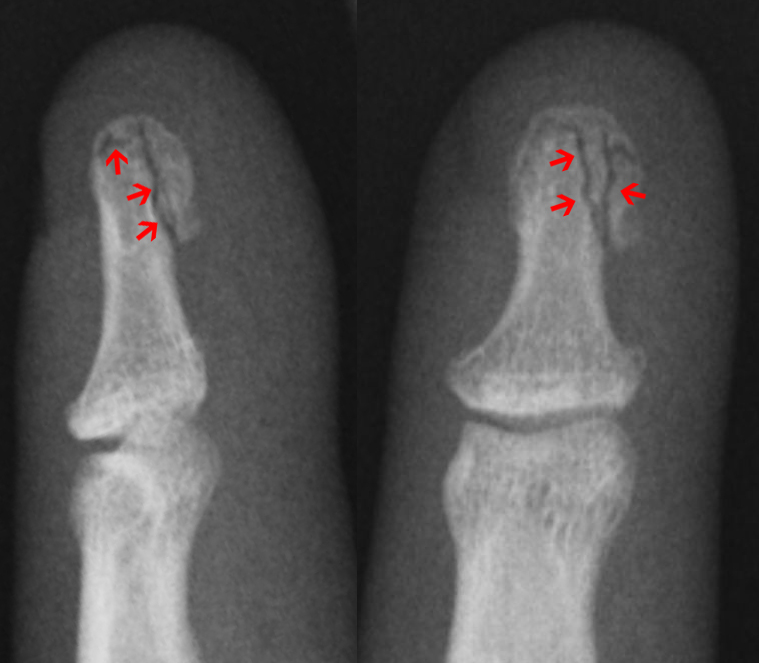
Hitting one's fingertip with a hammer can cause a comminuted (multi-fragment) fracture of the finger.

A hammer may cause significant injury if it strikes the body. Both manual and powered hammers can cause peripheral neuropathy or a variety of other ailments when used improperly. Awkward handles can cause repetitive stress injury (RSI) to hand and arm joints, and uncontrolled shock waves from repeated impacts can injure nerves and the skeleton. Additionally, striking metal objects with a hammer may produce small metallic projectiles which can become lodged in the eye. It is therefore recommended to wear safety glasses.

== War hammers ==
A war hammer is a late medieval weapon of war intended for close combat action.

== Symbolism ==
A T-shaped hammer in the upper left corner of the coat of arms of Tampere

The hammer, being one of the most used tools by humans, has been used very much in symbols such as flags and heraldry. In the Middle Ages, it was used often in blacksmith guild logos, as well as in many family symbols. The hammer and pick are used as a symbol of mining.

In mythology, the gods Thor (Norse) and Sucellus (Celtic and Gallo-Roman), and the hero Hercules (Greek), all had hammers that appear in their lore and carried different meanings. Thor, the god of thunder and lightning, wields a hammer named Mjölnir. Many artifacts of decorative hammers have been found, leading modern practitioners of this religion to often wear reproductions as a sign of their faith.

In American folklore, the hammer of John Henry represents the strength and endurance of a man.

A political party in Singapore, Workers' Party of Singapore, based their logo on a hammer to symbolize the party's civic nationalism and social democracy ideology.

A variant, well-known symbol with a hammer in it is the hammer and sickle, which was the symbol of the former Soviet Union and is strongly linked to communism and early socialism. The hammer in this symbol represents the industrial working class (and the sickle represents the agricultural working class). The hammer is used in some coats of arms in former socialist countries like East Germany. Similarly, the Hammer and Sword symbolizes Strasserism, a strand of Nazism seeking to appeal to the working class. Another variant of the symbol was used for the North Korean party, Workers' Party of Korea, incorporated with an ink brush on the middle, which symbolizes both Juche and Songun ideologies.

In Pink Floyd – The Wall, two hammers crossed are used as a symbol for the fascist takeover of the concert during "In the Flesh". This also has the meaning of the hammer beating down any "nails" that stick out.

The gavel, a small wooden mallet, is used to symbolize a mandate to preside over a meeting or judicial proceeding, and a graphic image of one is used as a symbol of legislative or judicial decision-making authority.

Judah Maccabee was nicknamed "The Hammer", possibly in recognition of his ferocity in battle. The name "Maccabee" may derive from the Aramaic maqqaba (see Judah Maccabee § Origin of Name "The Hammer".).

The hammer in the song "If I Had a Hammer" represents a relentless message of justice broadcast across the land. The song became a symbol of the civil rights movement.

== Image gallery ==
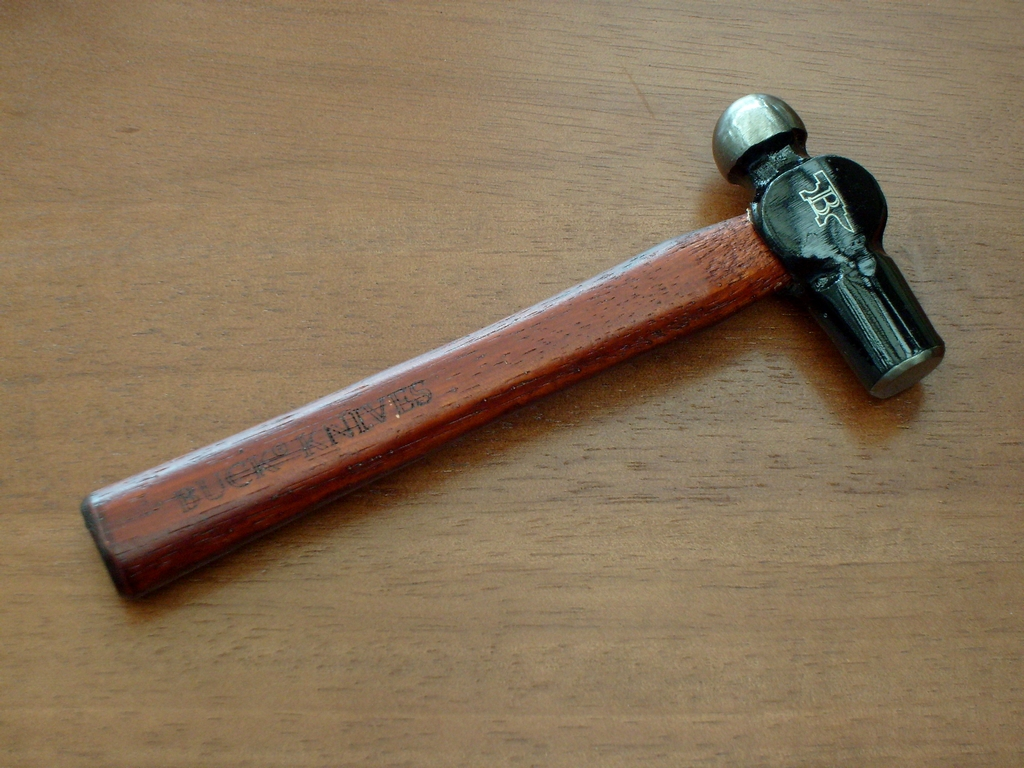
Ball-peen hammer

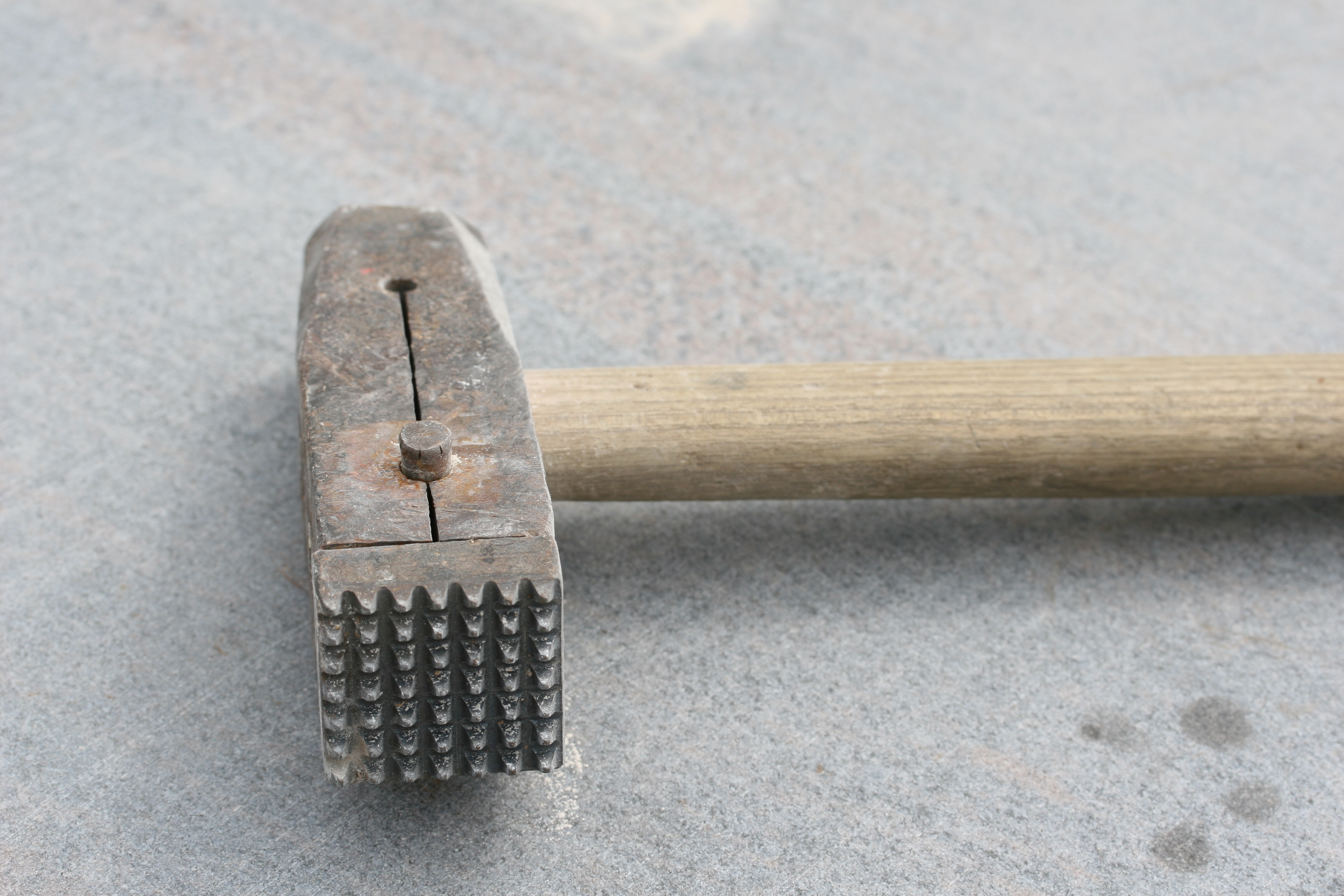
Bush hammer

Claw hammer

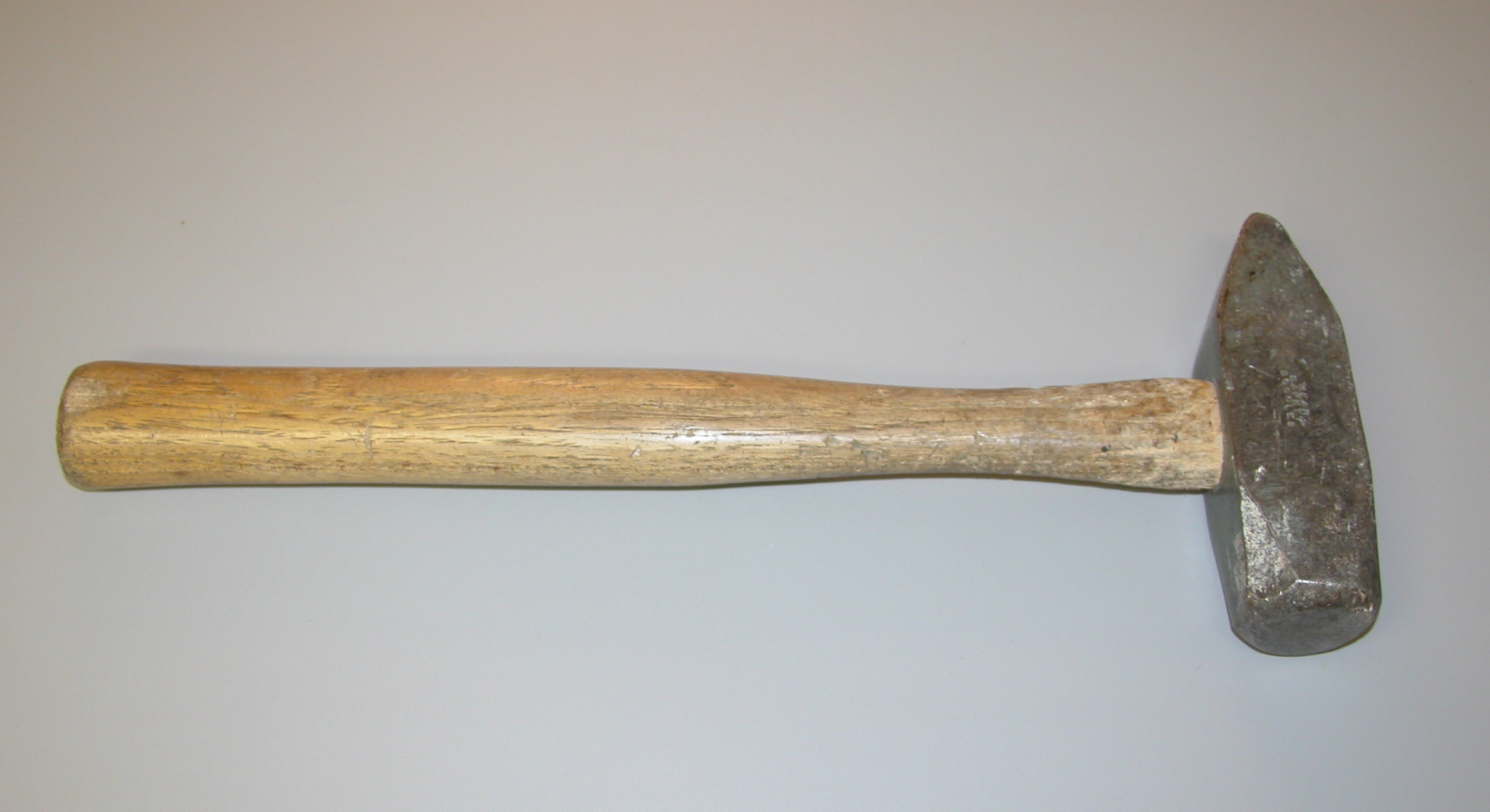
Cross-peen hammer

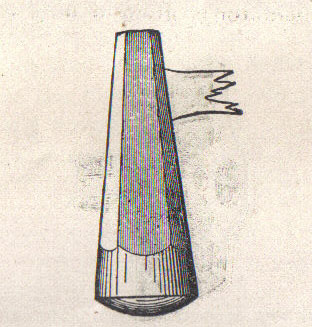
Dog-head hammer (blacksmithing)

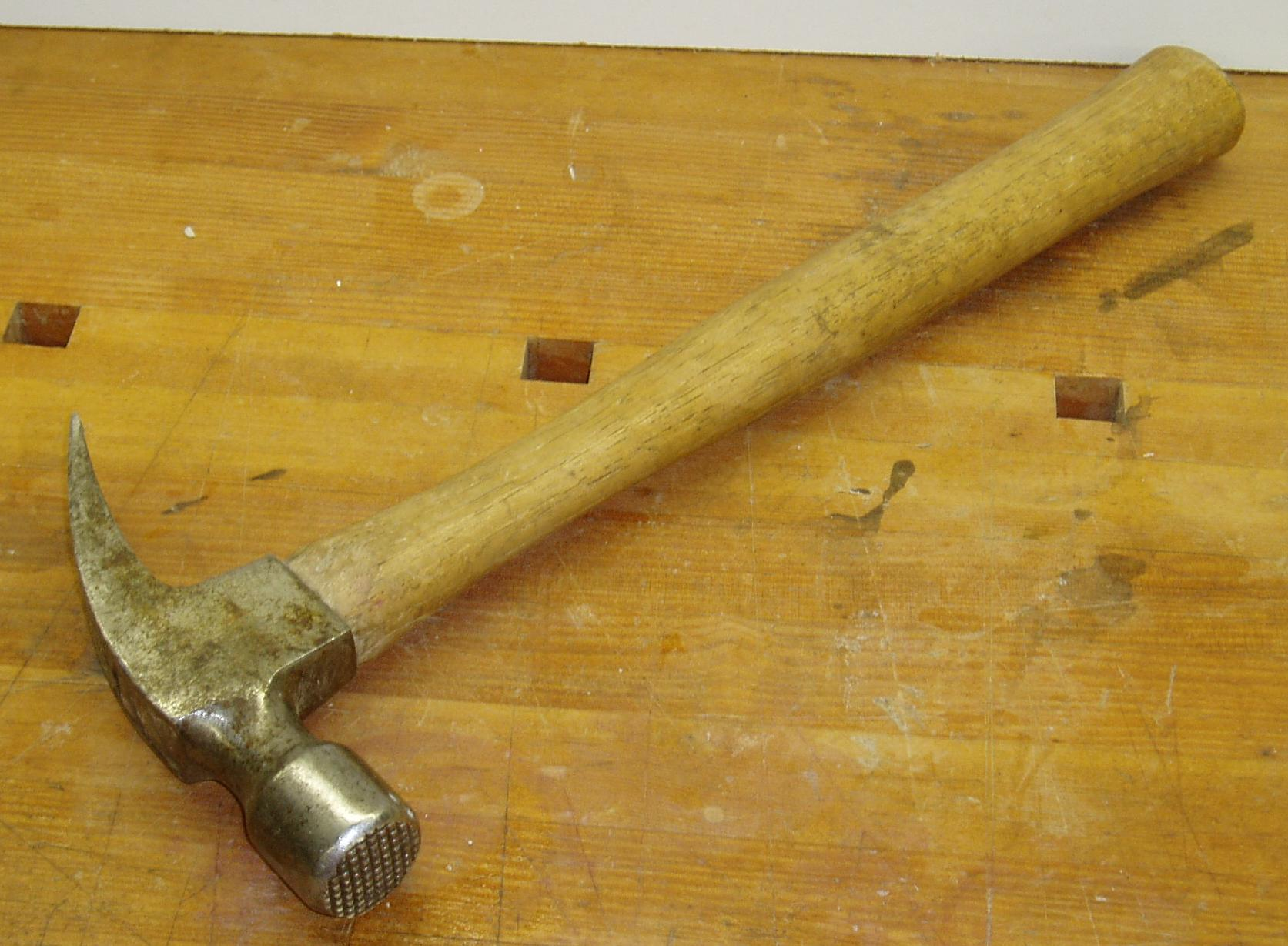
Framing hammer

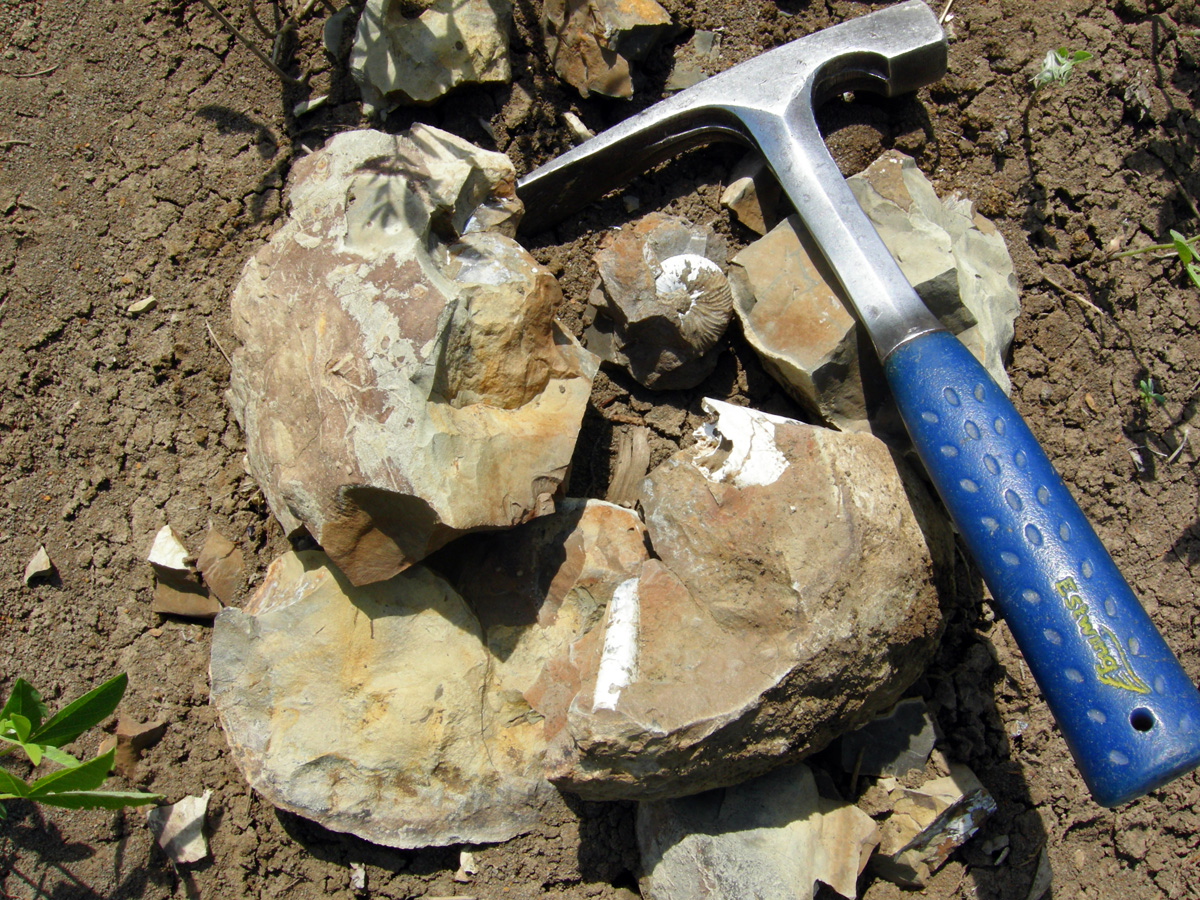
Geologist's hammer

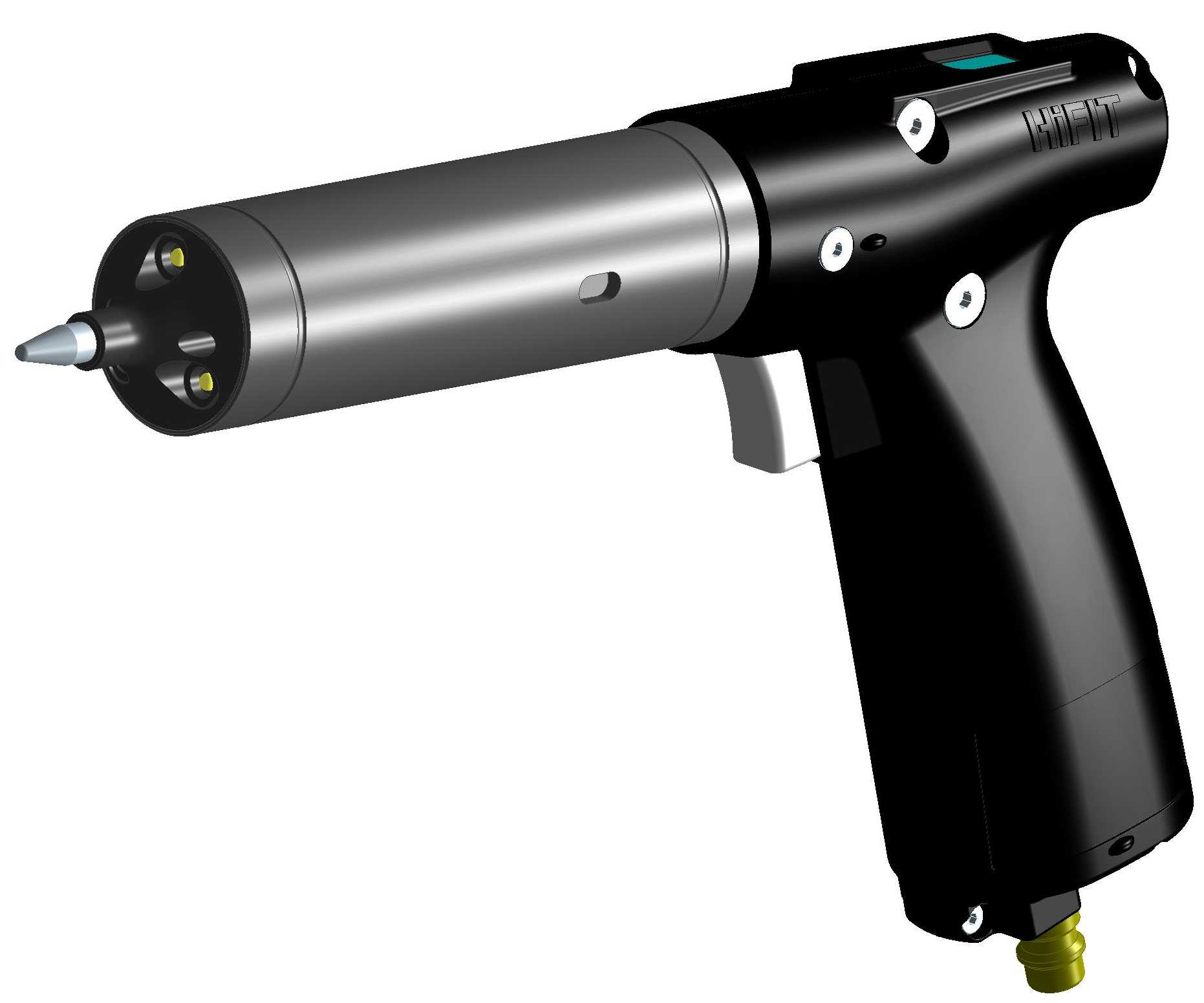
HiFIT-hammer for aftertreatment of weld transitions

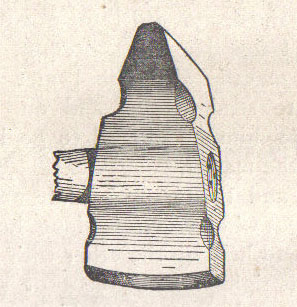
Long cross-face hammer (blacksmithing)

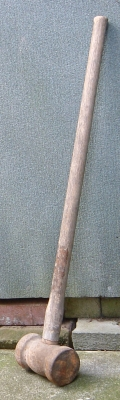
Post maul

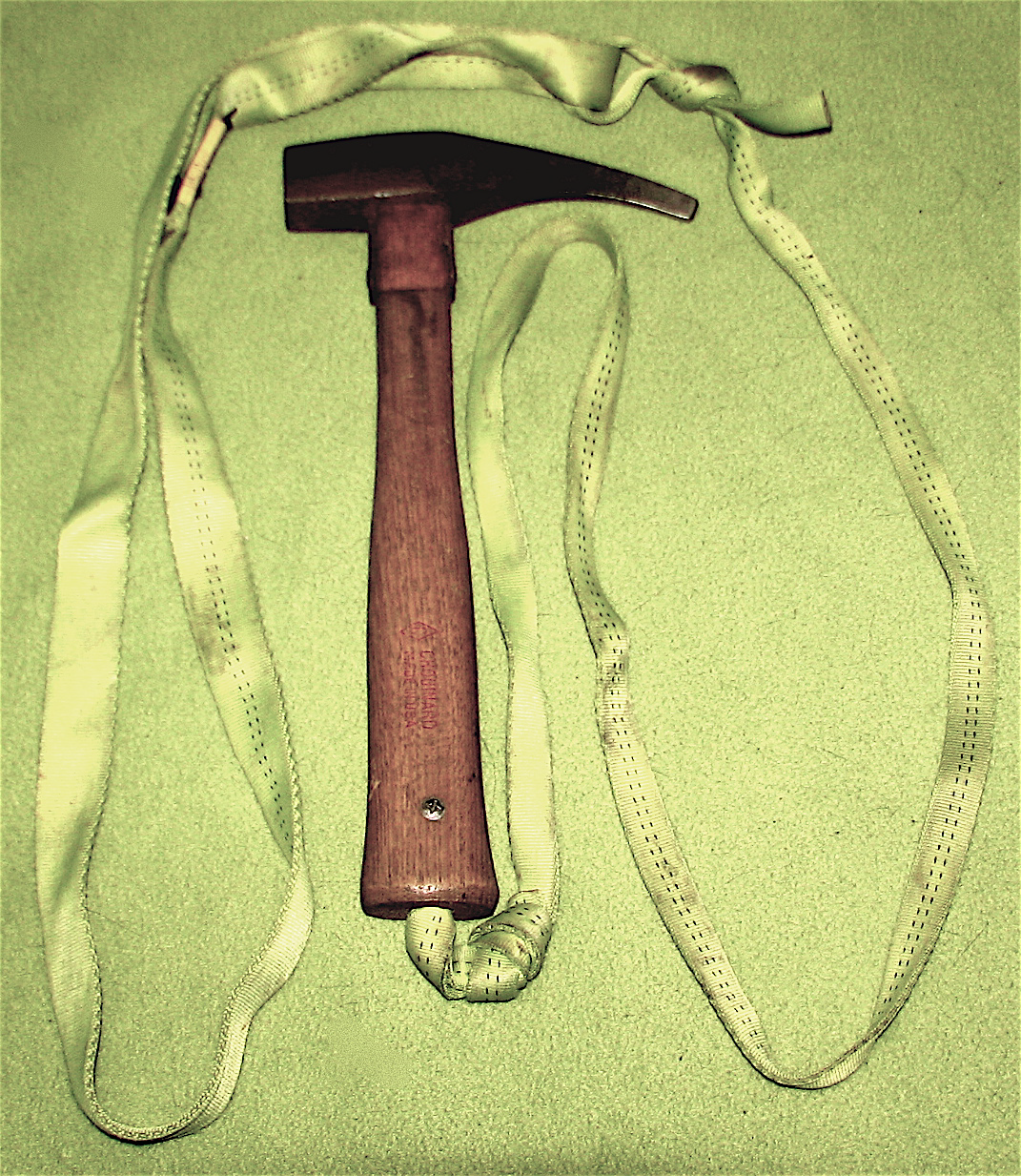
Rock climbing hammer

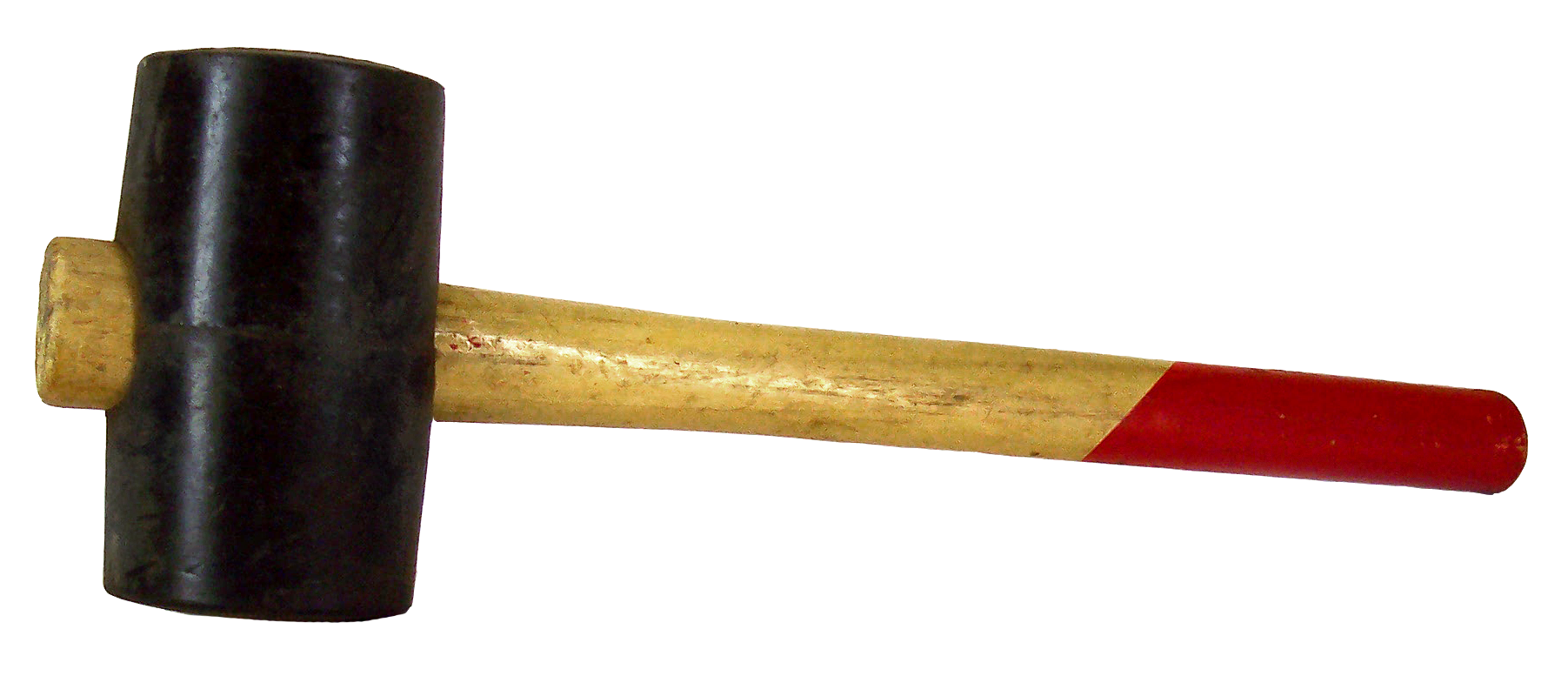
Rubber mallet

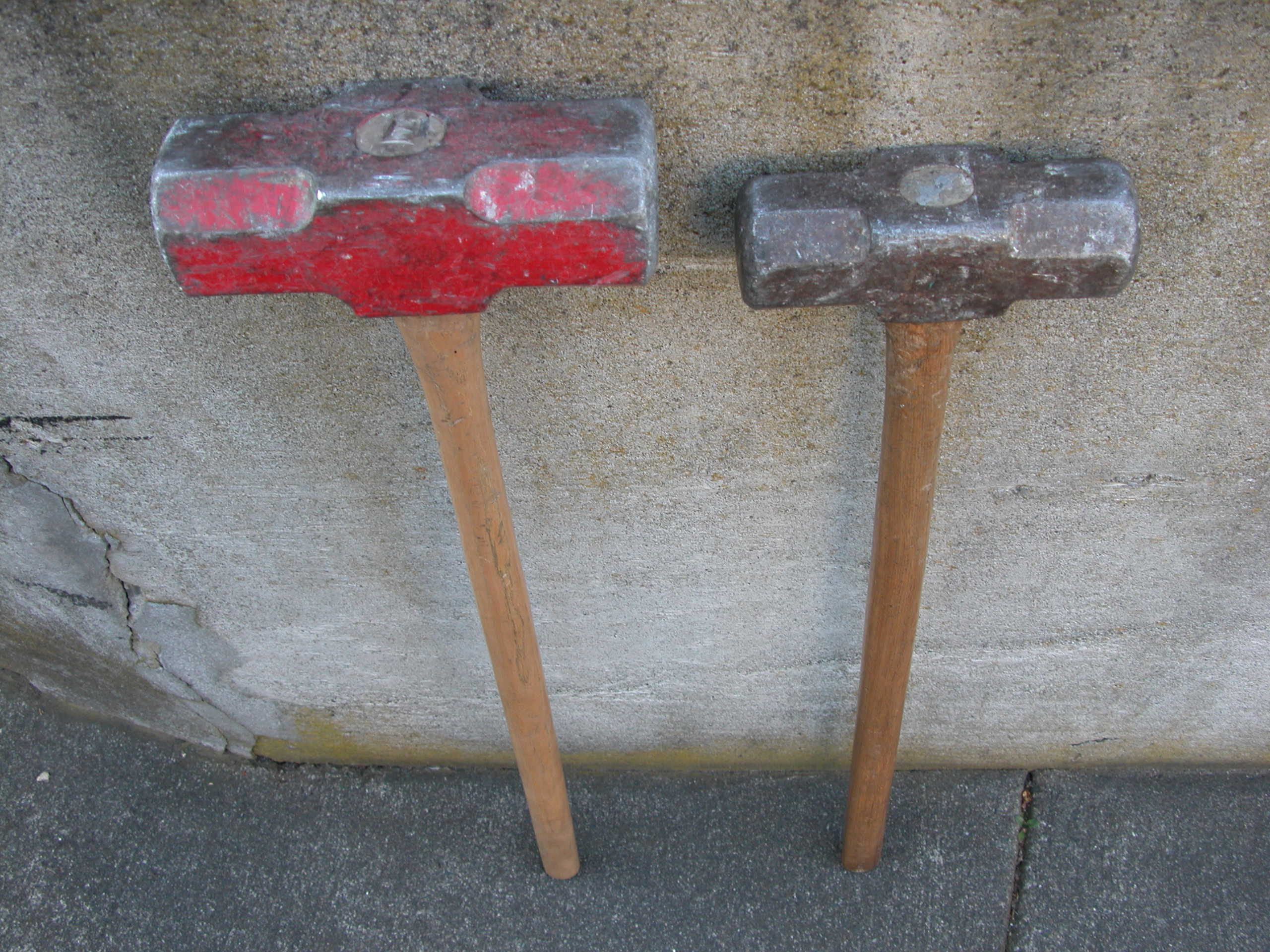
Sledgehammers

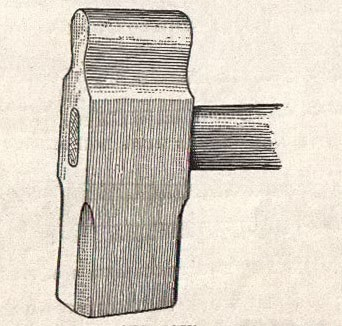
Straight pane sledgehammer

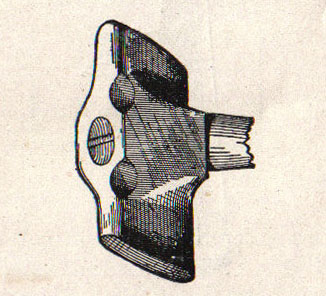
Twist hammer (blacksmithing)

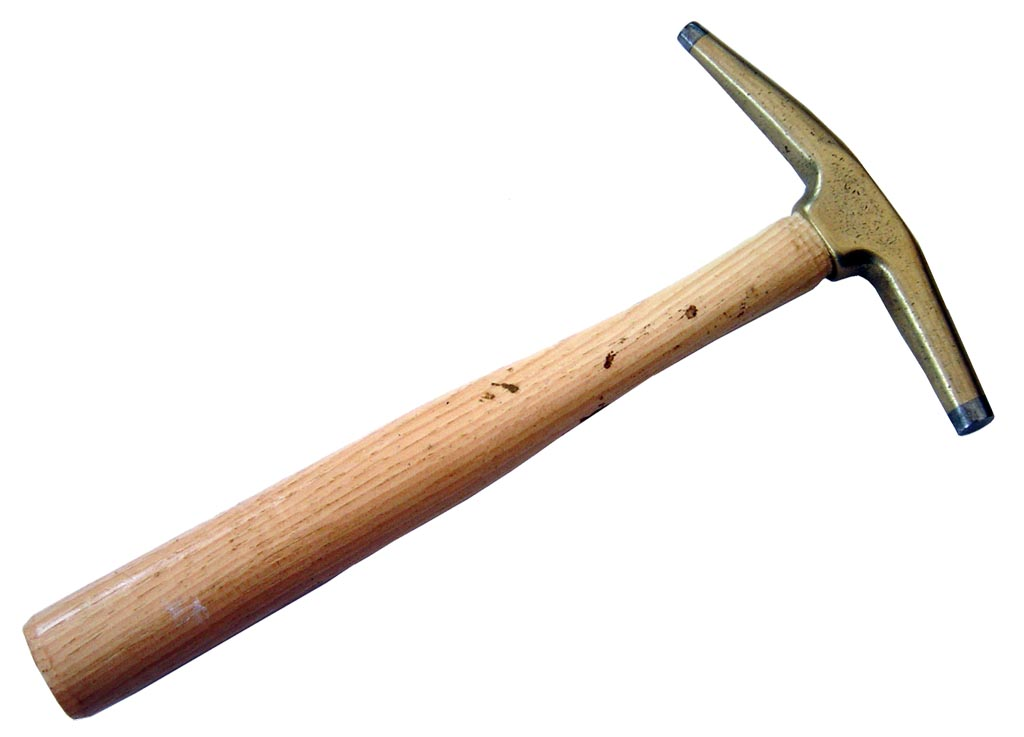
Upholstery hammer

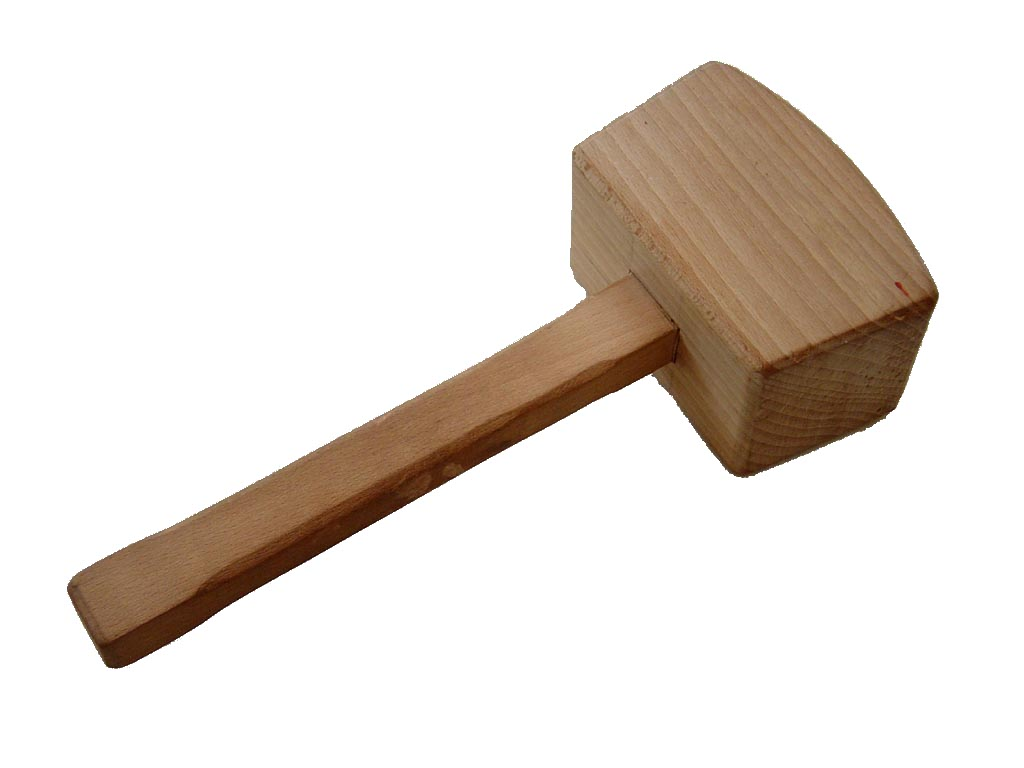
Wooden mallet

== See also ==
- Hammer Museum (Haines, Alaska)
- Mjölnir
