= Soft-faced hammer =

Hammer designed to avoid damaging surfaces

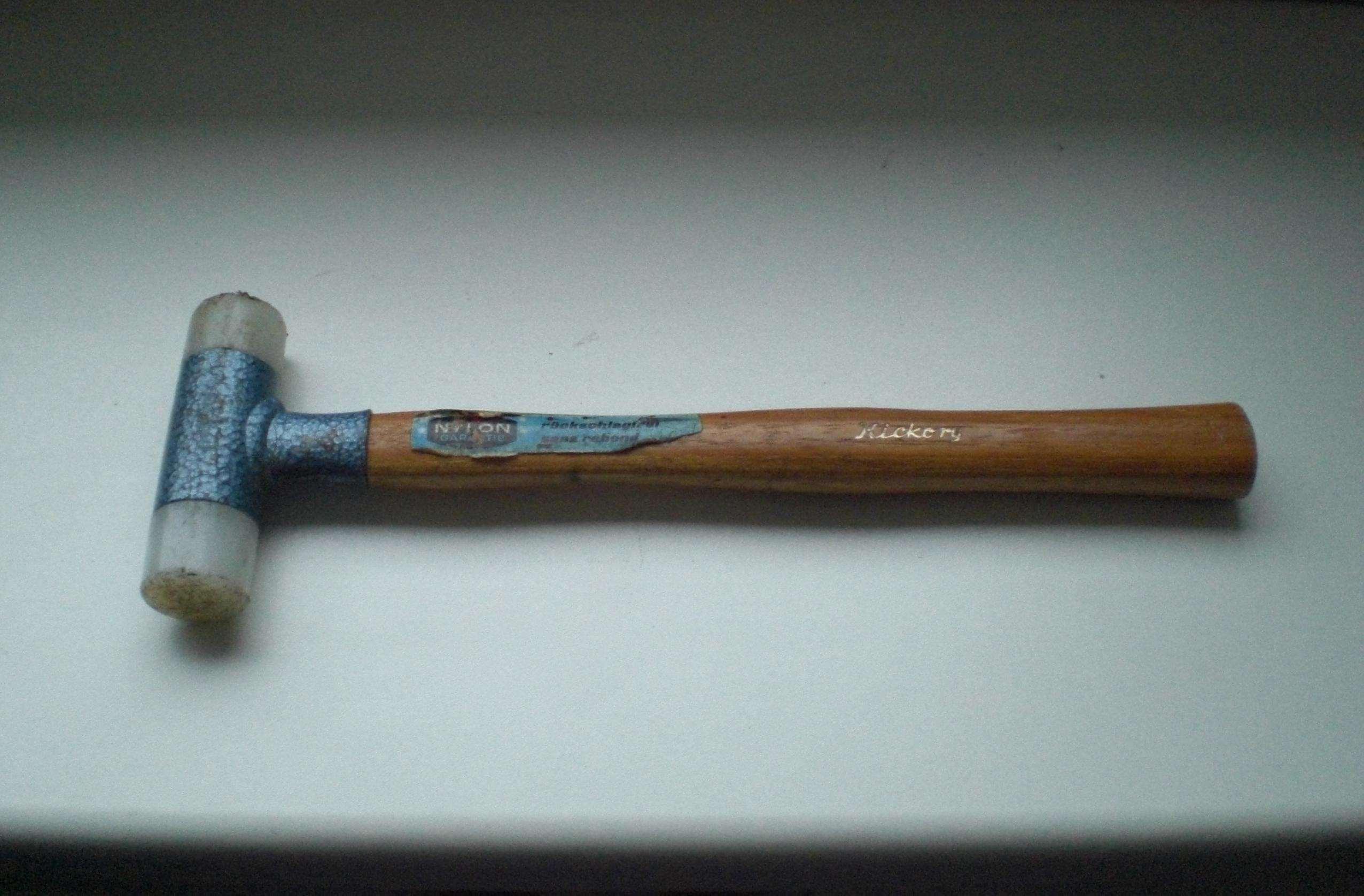
Soft faced hammer or mallet with plastic faces

A soft-faced hammer or mallet is a hammer designed to offer driving force without damaging surfaces. They also reduce the force transmitted back to the arm or hand of the user, by temporarily deforming more than a metal hammer would.

== Materials ==
Soft-faced or deadblow mallets have faces made of materials such as plastics, including nylon, natural rubber or tightly wound rawhide, or soft metals such as copper, aluminium, brass or lead. The goal of the choice of material is to prevent damage to the struck surface.

The heads or individual faces are sometimes replaceable, because they will deform, wear out, or break over time.

The hammers are graded by the weight of the head and by hardness of the striking face.

Heads cast in solid brass are used in applications where less vibration is needed.

== See also ==
- Dead blow hammer
