= Mallet =

Hammer-like tool with a large head

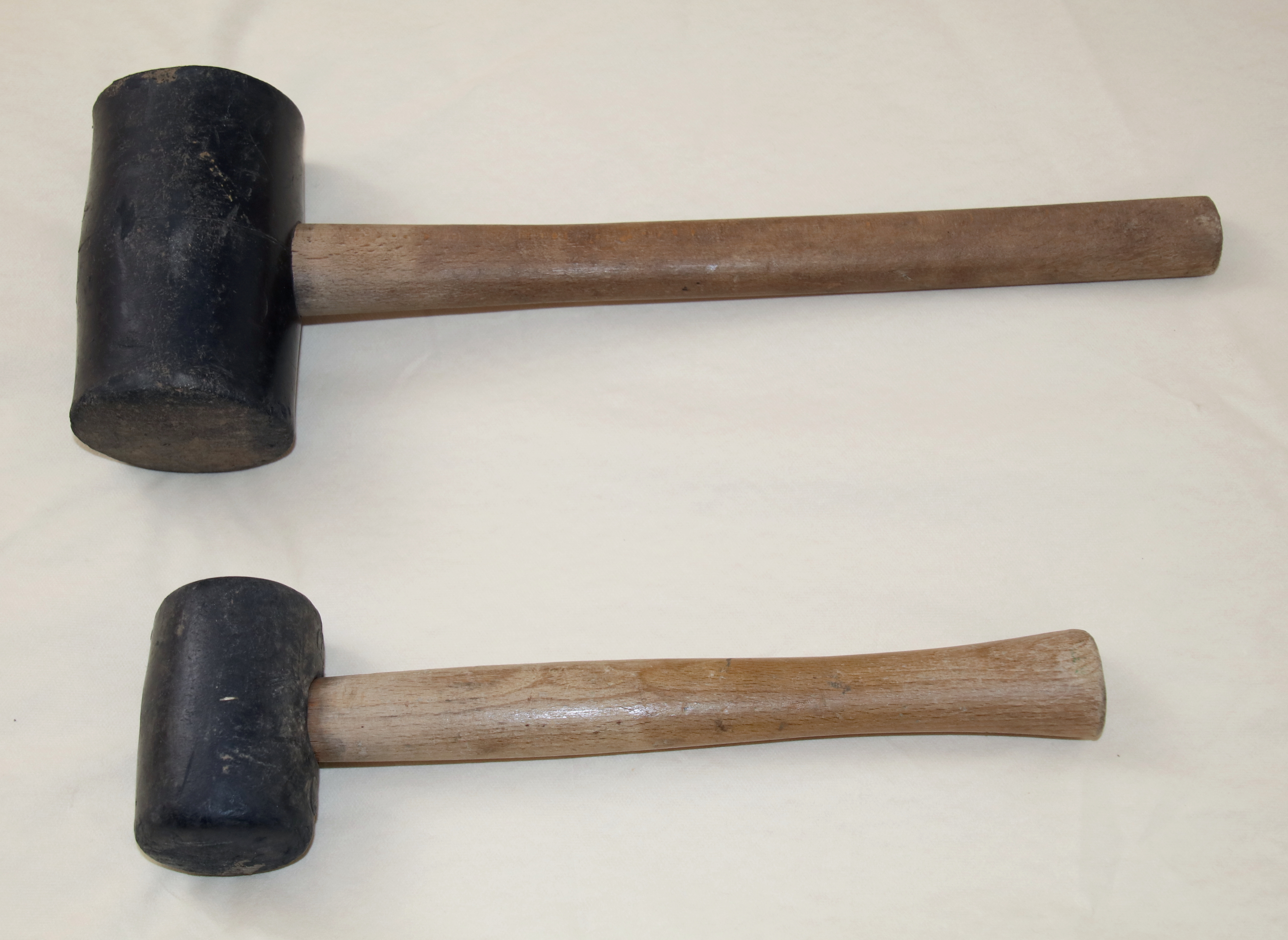
Rubber mallets

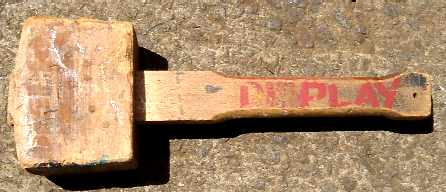
A wooden mallet

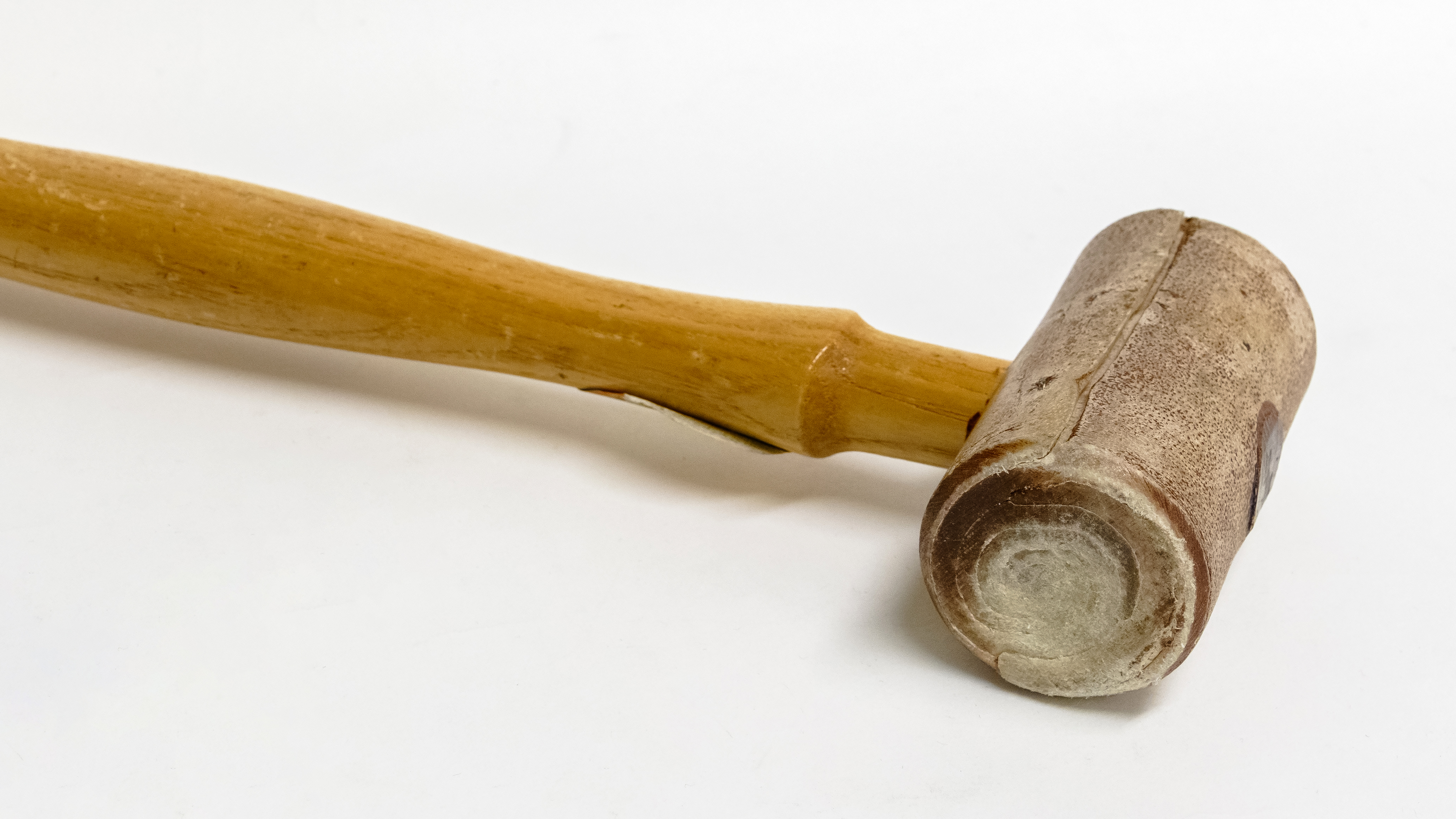
Rawhide mallet

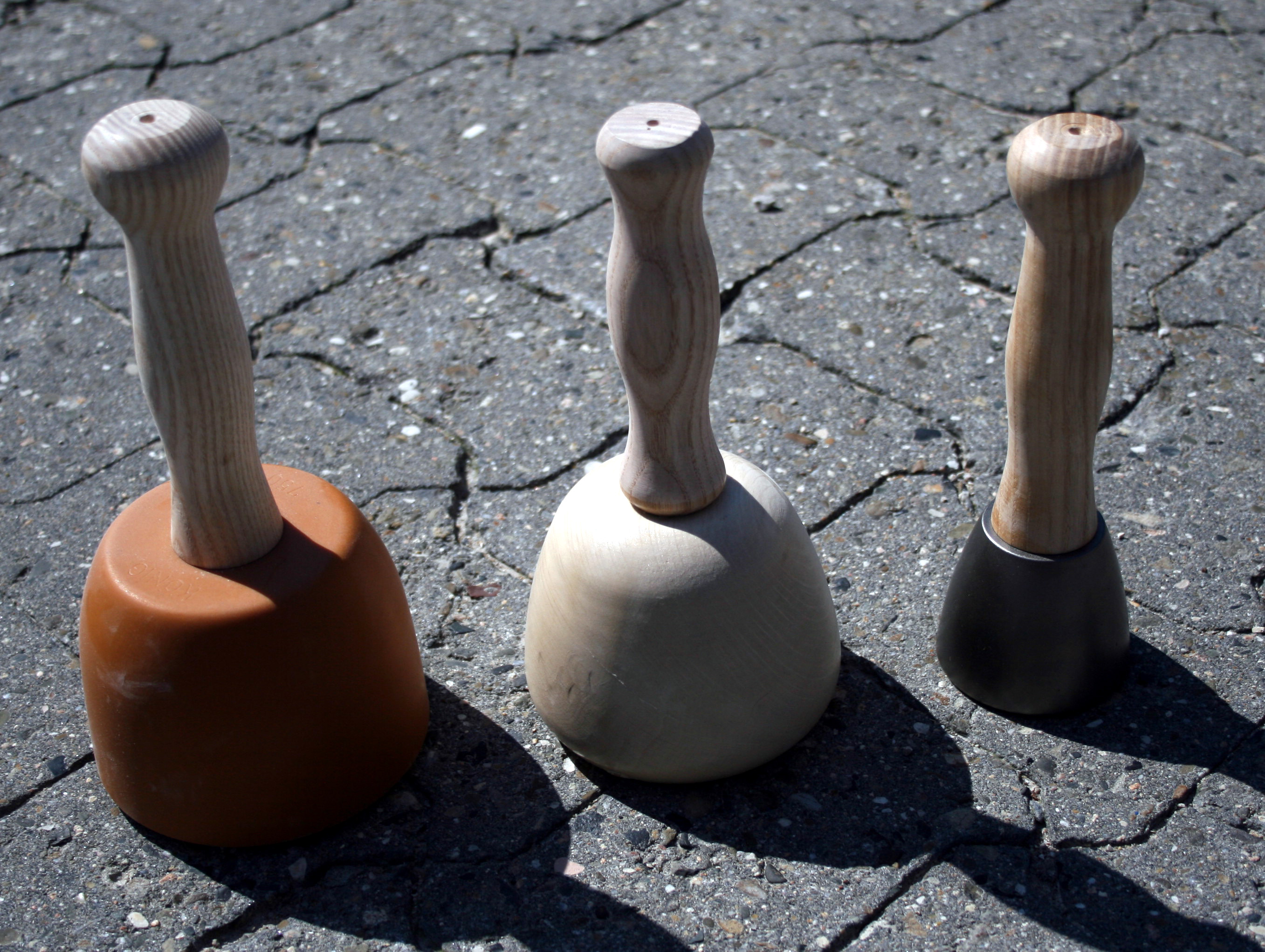
Stonemason's mallets of plastic, wood and steel

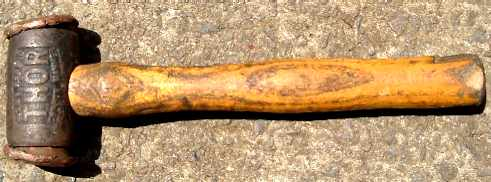
An iron mallet with copper faces. Solid head copper mallets are produced with a round or square head

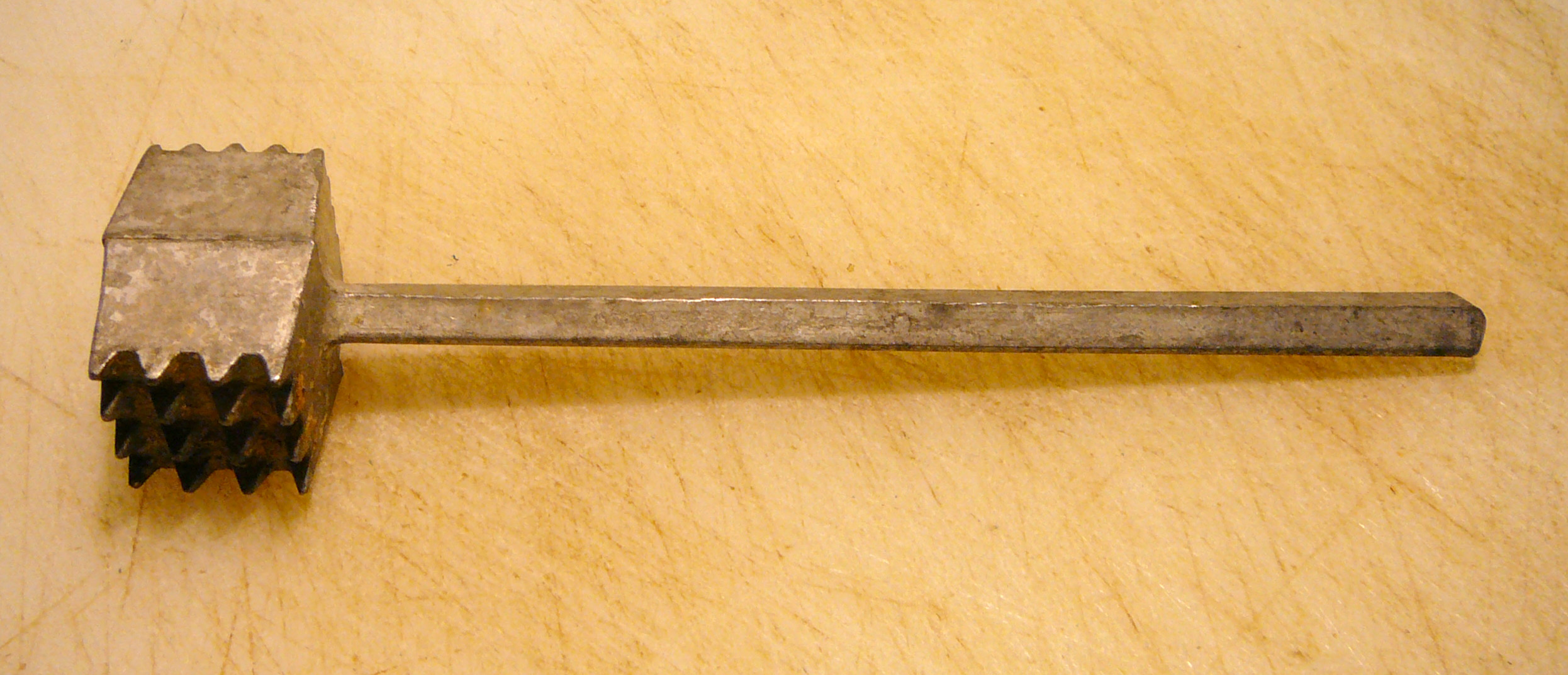
An aluminium meat mallet, for tenderizing meat

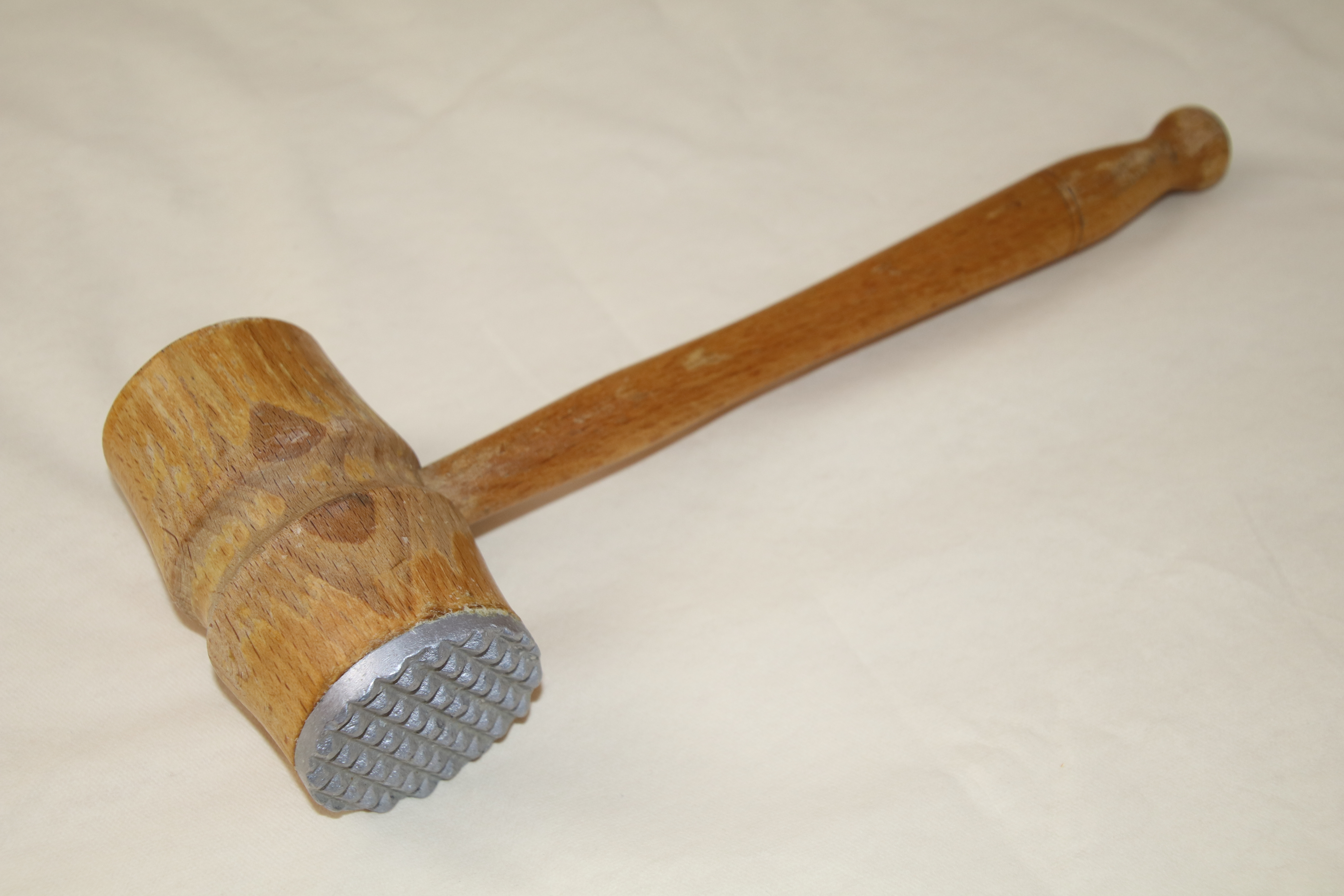
Meat mallet.

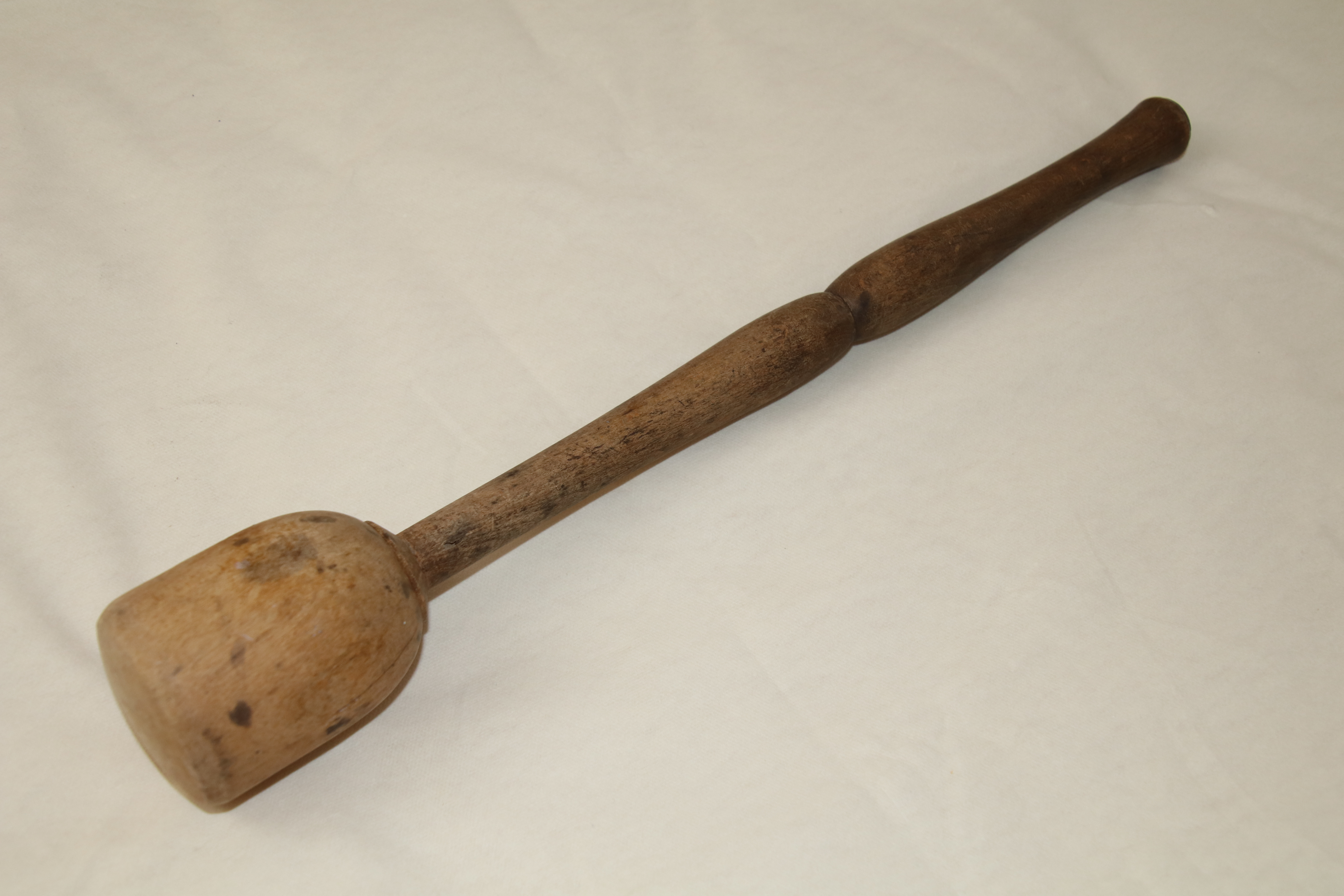
Cooking mallet for crushing crops.

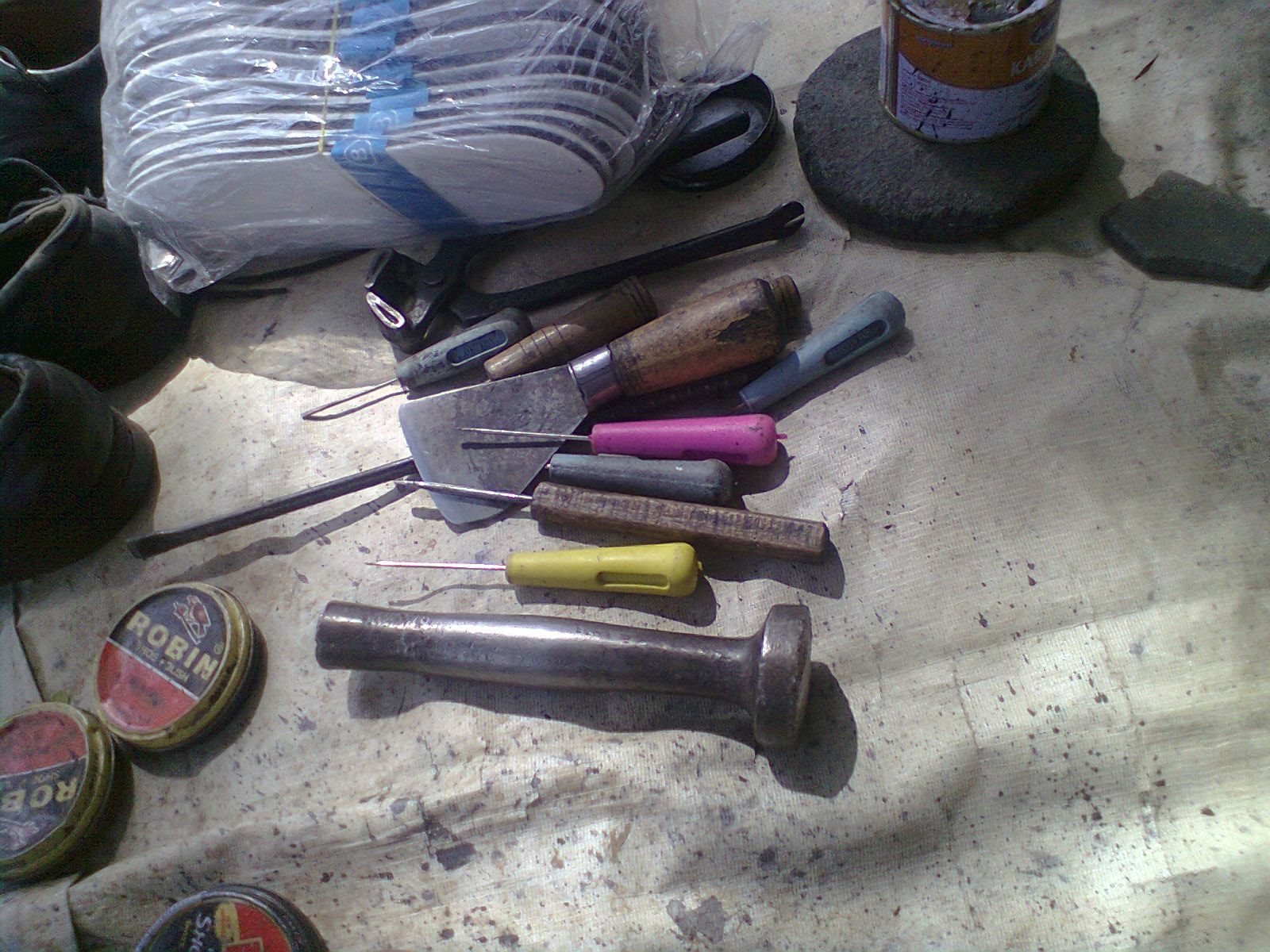
Indian cobbler tool kit, with an iron mallet

A mallet is a tool used for imparting force on another object, often made of rubber or sometimes wood, that is smaller than a maul or beetle, and usually has a relatively large head.

== General overview ==
The term is descriptive of the overall size and proportions of the tool, and not the materials it may be made of, though most mallets have striking faces that are softer than steel.

Mallets are used in various industries, such as upholstery work, and a variety of other general purposes. It is a tool of preference for wood workers using chisels with plastic, metal, or wooden handles, as they give a softened strike with a positive drive.

- Wooden mallets are usually used in carpentry to knock wooden pieces together, or to drive dowels, chisels and to apply pressure on joints. A wooden mallet will not deform the striking end of a metal tool, as most metal hammers would. It is also used to reduce the force driving the cutting edge of a chisel, giving better control. Hardwood mallets are also used to knock in cricket bats.
- Copper, brass and leaden mallets are typically used on machinery to apply force to parts with a reduced risk of damaging them, and to avoid sparks. As these metals are softer than steel, the mallet is deformed by any excessive force, rather than any steel object it is hitting.
- Meat mallets tenderise or flatten meat. Made from wood or metal, they are typically two-sided, one flat or with slight bumps, and the other with more pronounced protrusions. Their use has been reduced with the invention of cube steak machines and other electric tenderisers, but they can still be readily found at cookery stores and in professional use.

Less common mallets include:

- Rawhide mallets, which may employ rawhide covering a steel head, or simply consist of rolled-up rawhide, are used for leatherwork, jewellery, and assembling electric motors and delicate machinery.
- Plastic mallets, made of nylon, polycarbonate, or polystyrene are used especially in leatherwork and jewellery.
- Split head mallets have removable faces which can be changed to an appropriate material for the job.
- Beetle mallets, also called a persuader or commander, are large mallets with a wood or plastic head, with rounded ends about 15 to 18 inches (380 to 460 mm) in diameter, and a handle about 3 feet (0.91 m) long. It is used by paviours for tapping paving stones into position when bedding them. Beetles are used in jobs such as timber framing to shift the bases of large wooden posts, to fit joints, to drive in pegs, to split wood or rails.
- Dead blow mallets typically have an internal cavity partially filled with steel shot, lead shot, or loose sand. This modification evens out the time-impulse curve of the impact, enabling a more powerful blow to be delivered without risk of marring the target.
- Carver's mallets feature heads where the axis of rotation is in line with the handle (so the hitting surface is always round) in a shape like a cylinder on its end, or a conical frustum, or half of a capsule (see images of "stonemason's mallets" to the right). The round striking surface is designed to drive a chisel or wedge and allows for a face to strike when swinging from any angle.

Mallets of various types are some of the oldest forms of tools, and have been found in Stone Age gravesites.

== Musical instruments ==
Mallets used as drumsticks are often used to strike a marimba, xylophone, glockenspiel, metallophone, or vibraphone, collectively referred to as mallet percussion. The sticks usually have shafts made of rattan, birch, or fiberglass. Rattan shafts are more flexible than the other materials. Heads vary in size, shape, and material; they may be made of metal, plastic, rubber, or wood, and some are wrapped with felt, cord, or yarn. Heavier heads produce louder sounds, while harder heads produce sharper and louder sounds, with more overtones.

== Toys ==
Mallets are commonly used as children's toys. Lightweight wooden mallets are used for peg toys. Toy mallets are also used in games such as Whac-A-Mole. Another type of toy mallet is a plastic mallet made of soft, hollow vinyl, with bellows and a built-in whistle, so that when the mallet is struck, it produces a sharp, chirping sound.

== Sports ==
Mallets are used in various stick sports, usually to strike a ball or other object. This includes sports such as polo and croquet. The polo mallet is used to drive a ball into a goal, whereas croquet mallet is used to drive a ball through a series of hoops.

== See also ==
- Gavel
- Hammer
- Sledgehammer
