= Stonemason's hammer =

Hammer with opposed flat and chisel blade striking faces

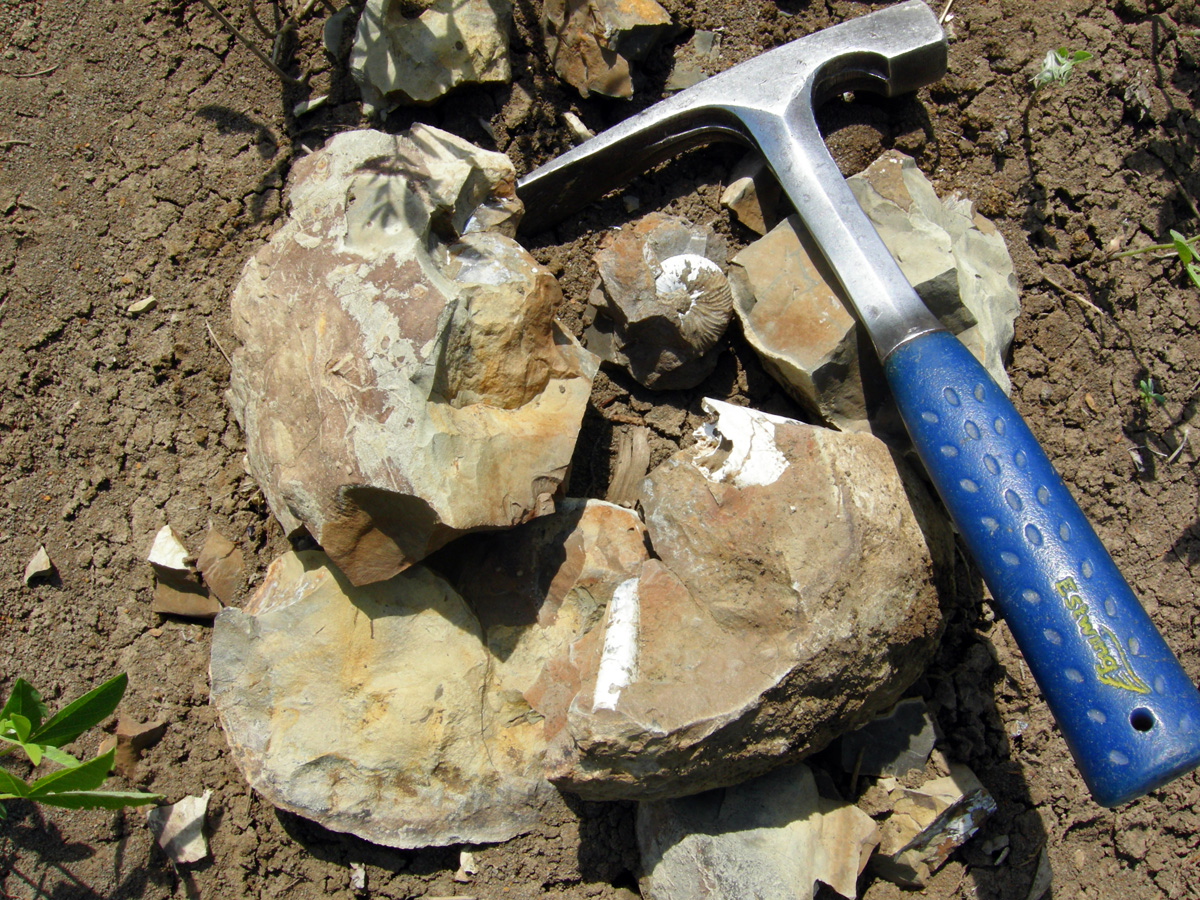
Stonemason's hammer used in geological work

A stonemason's hammer, also known as a brick hammer, has one flat traditional face and a short or long chisel-shaped blade. It can thus be used to chip off edges or small pieces of stone, cut brick or a concrete masonry unit, without using a separate chisel. The chisel blade can also be used to rapidly cut bricks or cinder blocks. This type of hammer is also used by geologists when collecting rock and mineral samples and is one of several types of geologist's hammer.
