= Warrington hammer =

Woodworkers' hammer

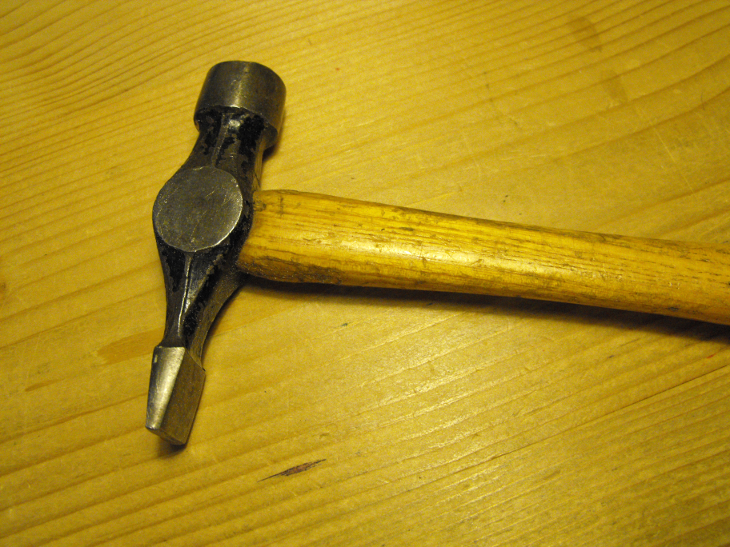
- Other names: Warrington pattern hammer; Joiners' hammer; English pattern hammer; Lancashire pattern Riveting hammer; Pin hammer (Scots)
- Classification: Woodworking hand tool

The Warrington hammer, joiners' hammer, English pattern hammer, or Warrington pattern hammer is a kind of cross-peen hammer used in woodworking. The chisel-like cross-peen side is used to set small nails and pins while the smaller, rounded face is used to finish driving them in. The cross-peen side of the tool is also used for refining work, such as furniture and cabinet making. While the standard claw hammer is used for tasks that involve greater use of force, the Warrington hammer is preferred for projects that require precision. A standard Warrington hammer is commonly around 12 1/2 inches (320 mm) in length with the hammer head weighing between 10 and 14 ounces (280 and 400 g).

== Primary use ==
The primary usage of the hammer involves holding a nail between the index finger and the thumb and setting it using the cross-peen side. It has a multitude of other uses, such as correcting a bent nail or even using the head as a makeshift anvil.

== History ==
The history of the tool dates to the mid-1800s with its name most likely coming from the town of Warrington in England.

== Parts of the Warrington hammer ==
- Head – The metal top of the hammer, typically made of steel.
- Face – The round striking surface on the end of the hammer.
- Peen – The chisel-like edge on the reverse side of the face.
- Handle – The shaft used to grip the tool. Typically made of wood.
