= Dead-blow hammer =

Specialized type of mallet

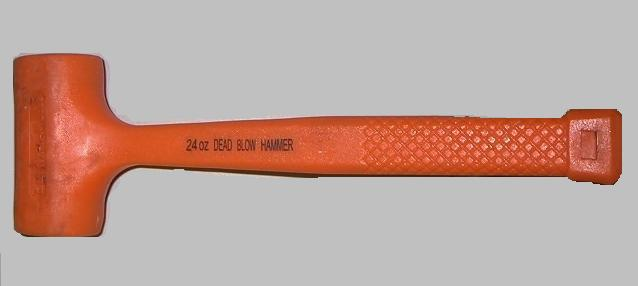
- Dead-blow hammer
- Other names: Dead-blow mallet
- Classification: Hammer
- Related: Rubber mallet

A dead-blow hammer is a specialized mallet helpful in minimizing damage to the struck surface and in controlling striking force, with minimal rebound from the struck surface. The minimal rebound is helpful in avoiding accidental damage to precision work, especially in tight locations and in applications such as maintenance work on hydraulic cylinders.

== Description ==
The head of the dead-blow hammer can be solid or hollow (often partially filled with loose steel shot), which distributes the energy of the strike over a longer period of time and reduces rebound.

Solid-head dead-blow hammers are usually made of rubber or resilient plastic (such as polyurethane or ultra-high-molecular-weight polyethylene) and rely on the inherent properties of the material to absorb shock and reduce rebound. Composite heads and fiberglass handle models are also available, with optional shock-absorbent rubber grips. A variant design omits the handle entirely; the dead-blow head is gripped directly in the hand, for use in tight locations.

Some dead-blow hammers have replaceable striking faces, attached by screwing or pressing them into place on the main body of the hammer. These replaceable faces or “inserts” can extend the life of the tool, and can also be hardness matched to the surface being struck, minimizing damage while allowing optimal energy transfer on impact.

== Principle of operation ==
In a conventional solid-head hammer, the momentum of the entire solid mass of the head is delivered in a short period following the moment of impact. A dead-blow hammer delivers the momentum over a longer period, resulting in less peak force, but similar total driving effect for the same head weight.

At the moment the face of the hammer head contacts the surface being struck, the sand or shot within the head is effectively trailing it (Inertia causes it to be collected at the trailing end of the head). The force imparted by this additional loose mass within the head is not imparted to the struck surface at the moment of contact. Instead, this force is spread out over some period of time, as the sand or shot descends to fill the "face" end of the head. Shortly after, pieces of shot rebounding from the striking-face side of the cavity collide with pieces that are still travelling towards it, dissipating a large portion of elastic energy as heat via friction. Such a blow is less "sharp" than that of the conventional hammer and feels more "dead", presenting less elastic rebound to the user; this is where the hammer gets its name.

This is why care must be taken in the selection of size and shape of filling particles. The internal mass must not act as a single slug as it would have no means of stopping itself from rebounding save for little friction against the cavity walls. This eliminates use of a single piece cylinder as well as powdered material which may compactify and act as a solid slug. Irregular-shaped filling material like sand generates more friction, but also causes particles to abrade each other faster, eventually reducing rebound dampening effectiveness. Round shot hardly abrades, but instead larger quantities are required to achieve the same level of dampening. It also deflects part of the force of the blow at an angle, making it less energy-efficient.

== Applications ==
Dead-blow hammers are commonly used in automotive repair for body work, dislodging stuck parts, hubcap installation, and installing and removing knock-off hubs. They also allow controlled use of impact force when performing engine or transmission repair.

In maintenance of hydraulic machinery and aerospace work, dead-blow hammers are useful in freeing stuck cylinders without damaging their precision-formed surfaces or any nearby bearings.

Dead-blow hammers are used in woodworking to knock joints together or apart without denting wood components.

In metalworking, a dead-blow hammer can be used to properly seat the workpiece against parallels in a machine vise.

Dead-blow hammers are sometimes used in orthopedic surgical procedures. The tools are also used to shape large diameter telecommunications cables within cable runs.

Deadblow mallets are also used in the installation of commercial and residential slab marble and granite applications, and concrete pavers.
