= Geologist's hammer =

Hammer used for splitting and breaking rocks

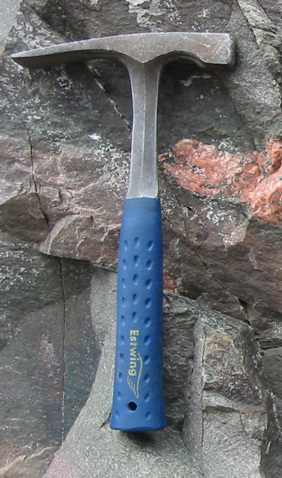
- A typical geologist's hammer
- Classification: Hand tool
- Uses: Sample collection
- Types: Chisel head Pick head
- Used with: Drilling hammer Cold chisel
- Related: Hammer

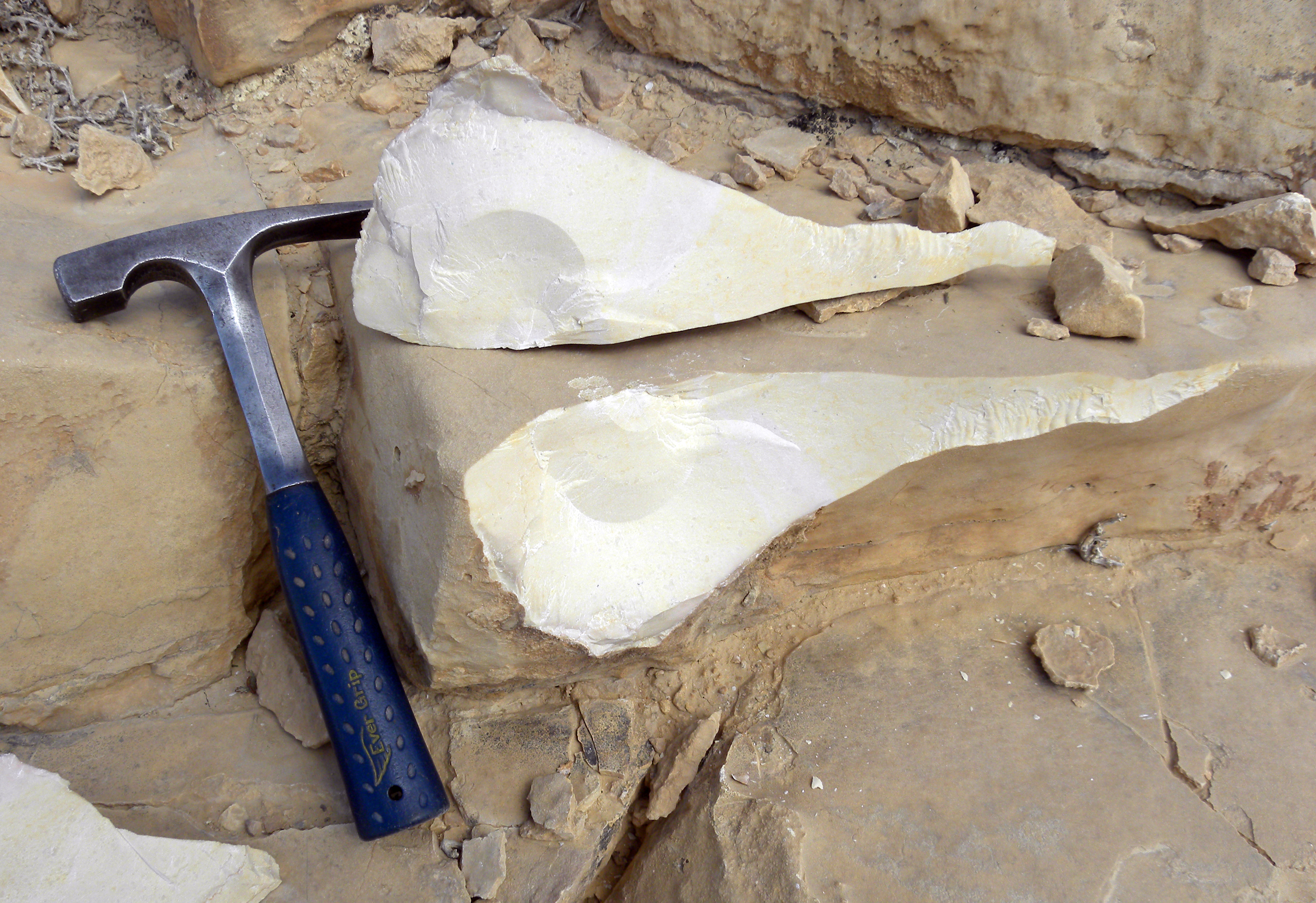
A geologist's hammer used for breaking rocks and serving as a scale reference in the photograph

A geologist's hammer, also known as rock hammer, rock pick, geological pick, or geo pick, is a specialized hammer used for splitting and breaking rocks. In field geology, it is employed to expose fresh rock surfaces, as weathered surfaces may obscure accurate analysis of a rock's composition, bedding orientation, mineralogy, history, and strength. In fossil and mineral collecting, geologist's hammers are used to break rocks in order to reveal specimens contained within.

== Shape ==
Geologist's hammers, as with most hammers, have two heads, one on either side. Most commonly, the tool consists of a flat square head on one end, with either a chisel or a pick head at the other end.

- A corner or edge of the flat head is used to deliver a blow to a rock with the intention of splitting it. Specimens or samples can be trimmed to remove sharp corners or reduce them in size.
- A chisel head (pictured) is useful for clearing loose material and vegetation from exposures, or creating exposures through digging. It is sometimes (at risk of damage) used to pry open fissures. Some rocks can be easily split, like slate or shale, to reveal any fossils.
- A pick head, which terminates in a sharp point to deliver maximum pressure, is often preferred for harder rocks. A geologist's hammer bearing a pick end is often referred to as a rock pick, geological pick, or prospecting pick instead of a geologist's hammer.

== Construction ==
The effective power of a geologist's hammer is mainly considered to be a reflection of its head weight and handle length. Head weight may range from 8 oz (230 g) or less on a small hammer—such as would generally be used for casual use or by children—to 4 lb (1.8 kg) and greater. A hammer of 2–2.5 lb (0.91–1.13 kg) has been described as most useful, although metamorphic or igneous rocks often require heavier hammers for a more powerful blow. In such cases geologists may prefer a sledge or bricklayer's "club" hammer.

The best geologist's hammers are forged from one piece of hardened steel, which renders them sturdy and long-lasting. Alternatives such as tubular- and wooden-shafted hammers are more commonly used, in part due to their lower cost. Such alternative handles sacrifice strength and make the hammer unsuitable for high-strain activities such as prying.

The form and weighting of the shaft defines the balance, which itself defines the ease, efficiency, and comfort of use of the geologist's hammer.

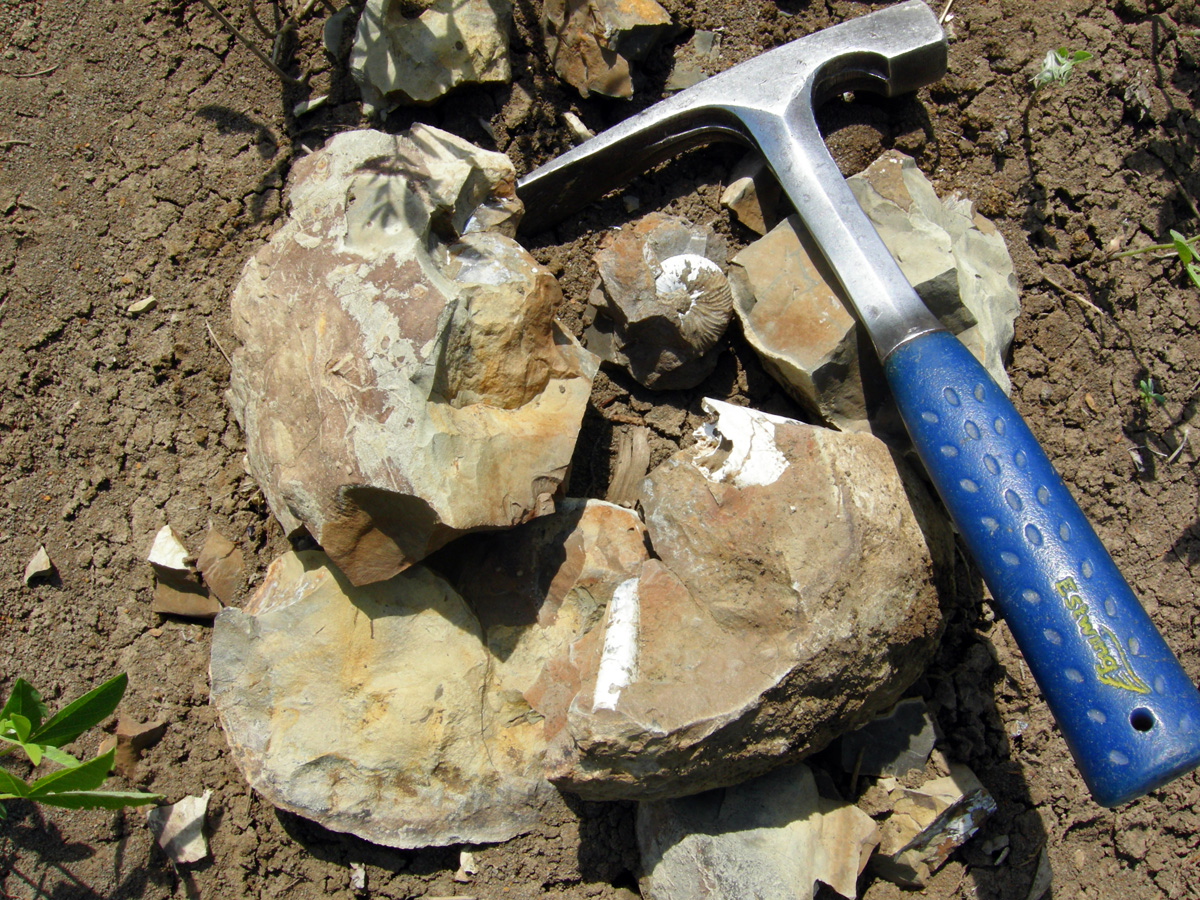
A hammer in the context of a fossil
