= Upholstery =

Covering of furniture with padding, springs, webbing, and fabric or leather

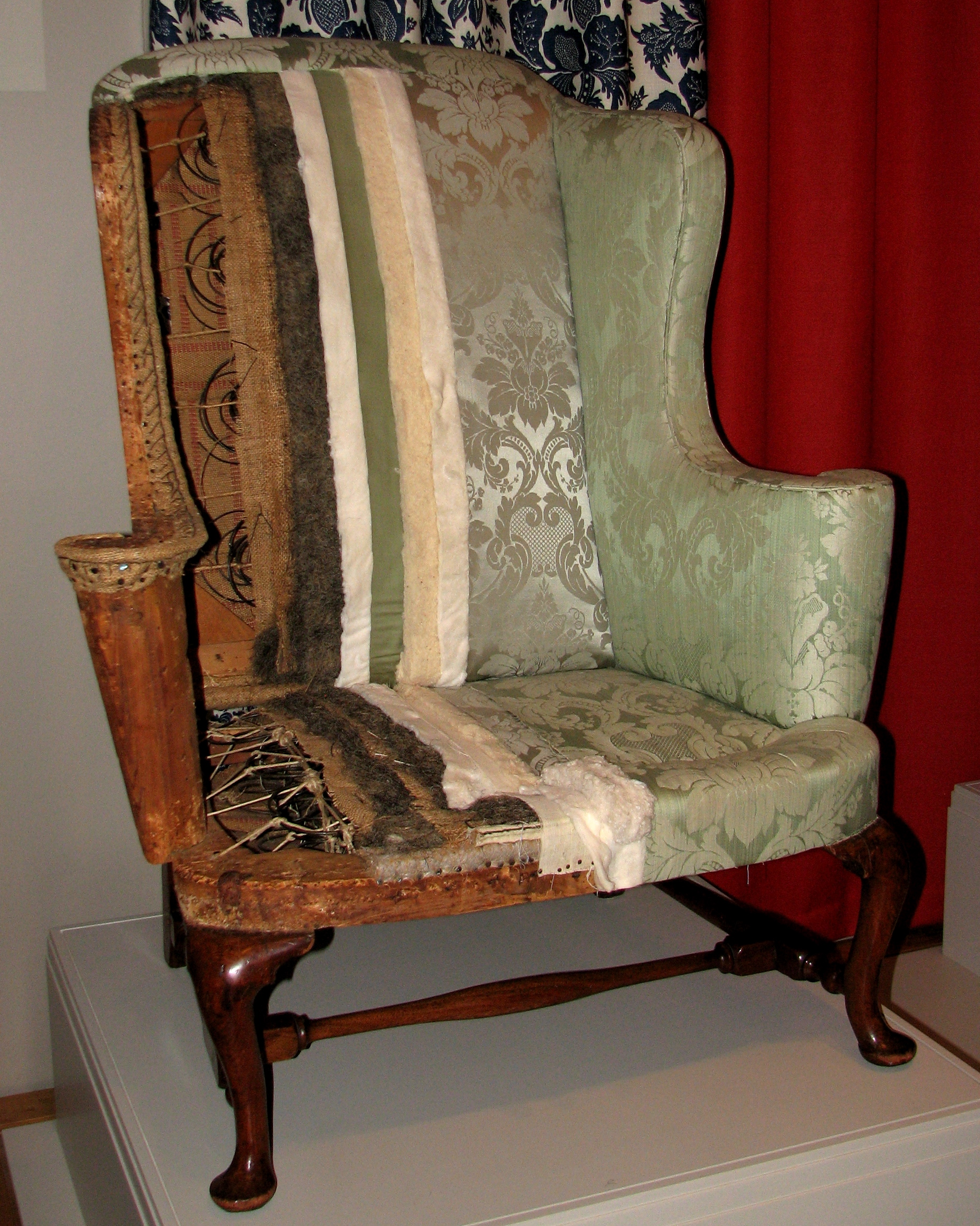
A New England easy chair with its upholstery sectioned

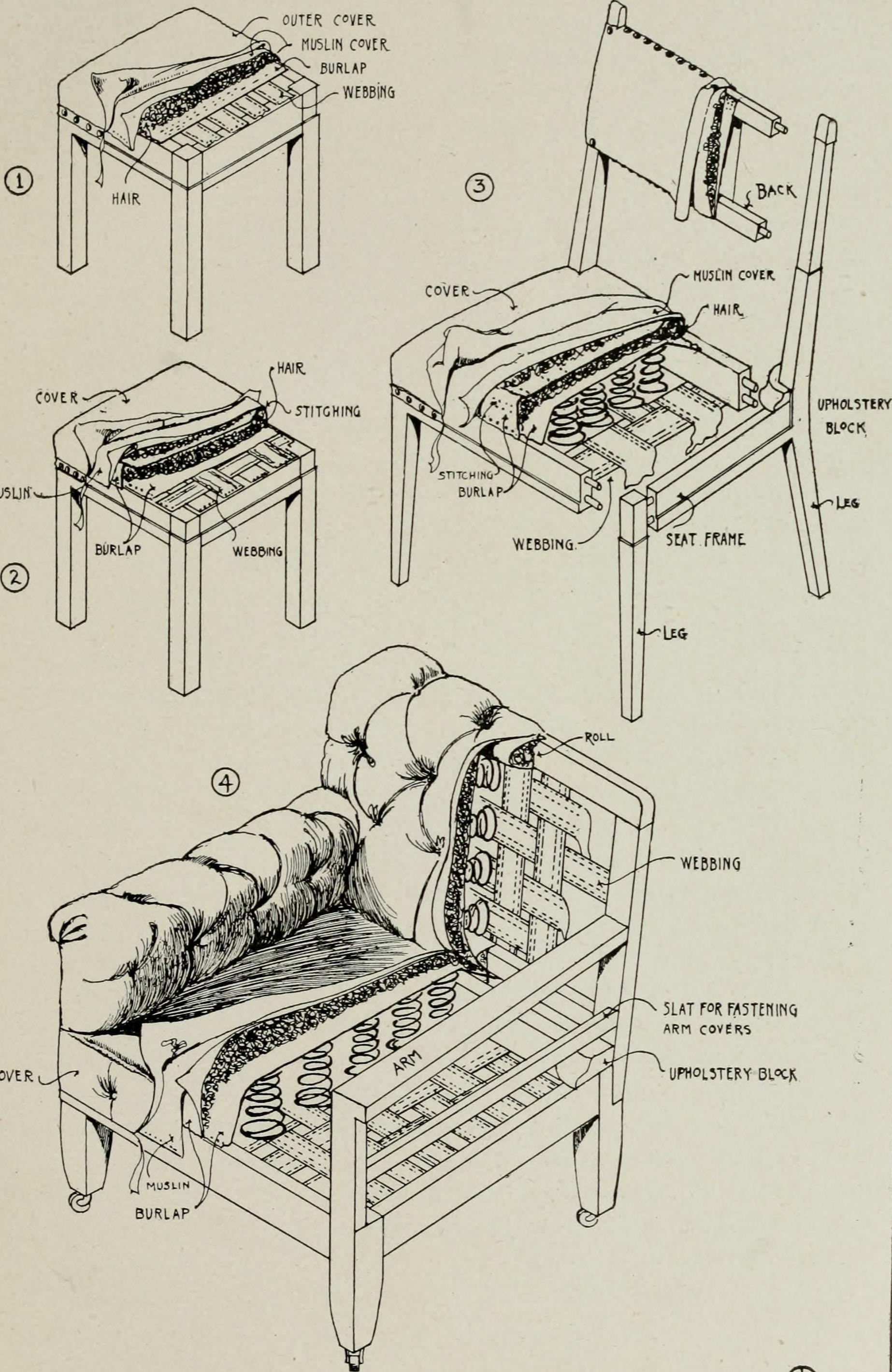
Cutaway illustration showing furniture construction details

Upholstery is the work of providing furniture, especially seats, with padding, springs, webbing, and fabric or leather covers. The word also refers to the materials used to upholster something.

Upholstery comes from the Middle English word upholder, which referred to an artisan who makes fabric furnishings. The term is equally applicable to domestic, automobile, airplane and boat furniture, and can be applied to mattresses, particularly the upper layers, though these often differ significantly in design. A person who works with upholstery is called an upholsterer. An apprentice upholsterer is sometimes called an outsider or trimmer. Traditional upholstery uses materials like coil springs (post-1850), animal hair (horse, hog and cow), coir, straw and hay, hessians, linen scrims, wadding, etc., and is done by hand, building each layer up. Modern upholsterers employ synthetic materials like dacron and vinyl, and serpentine springs.

== History ==
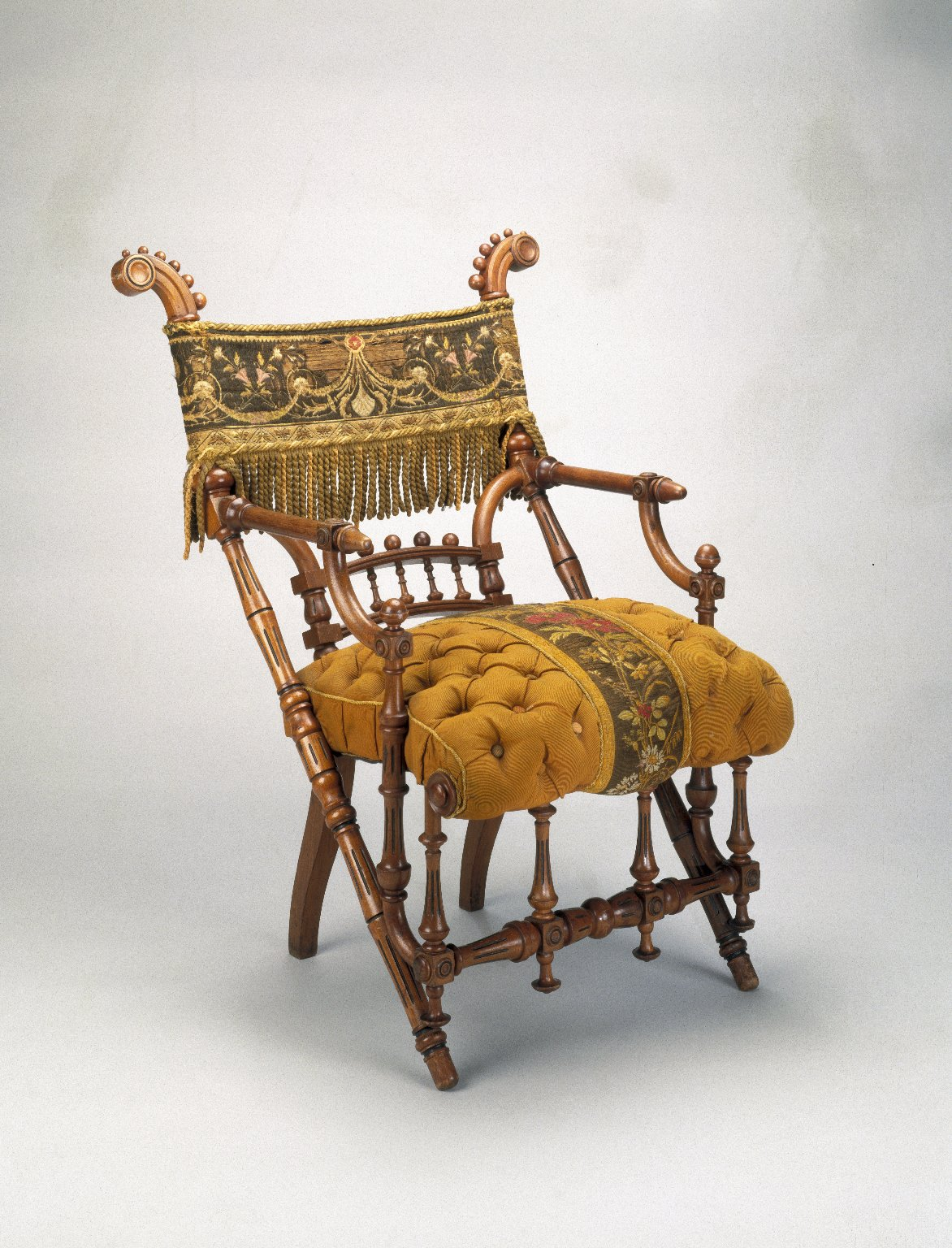
Armchair, designed in 1869 by George Jacob Hunzinger and patented on March 30, 1869. Wood, original upholstery. Brooklyn Museum

The term upholder is an archaic word that was historically used to refer to an upholsterer. The term has a specific connotation of repairing furniture rather than creating new upholstered pieces from scratch, similar to the distinction between a cobbler and a cordwainer.

In 18th-century London, upholders often took on the role of interior decorators, managing all aspects of a room's decor. These individuals were members of the Worshipful Company of Upholders, a guild whose traditional role, before the 18th century, was to provide upholstery, textiles, and fittings for funerals. In the prominent London furniture-making partnerships of the 18th century, it was common for a cabinet-maker to pair with an upholder. Notable examples include partnerships like Vile and Cobb, Ince and Mayhew, and Chippendale and Rannie or Haig.

In the United States, cities like Grand Rapids, Michigan, and Hickory, North Carolina, are well-known centers for furniture manufacture. In England, Long Eaton, Nottinghamshire, is recognized for its furniture industry, and many renowned upholsterers can still be found there. Nottinghamshire is also home to Webs Training Ltd, a company that specializes in training apprentices in the furniture manufacturing industry. These artisans continue to create or recreate a wide range of antique and modern furniture pieces.

Furniture reupholstery is a thriving industry in the UK, with small and large businesses offering restoration and maintenance services for antique and contemporary furniture.

During the reign of James VI and I (1603–1625), the Baroque style emerged, and stitched edging appeared, meaning bespoke shapes could be created by stitched cushion pads on wooden frames, allowing for the first time design and artistic flair to become a hallmark of upholstered furniture of the age. Farthingale chairs (without arms, see below) were introduced, due to the popularity at the time of the large hooped skirt from which the chairs take their name. The use of velvet in upholstered furniture becomes popular.

During the reign of Charles I (Caroline era), the Baroque style took hold in mainland Europe, and this style remained popular into the 18th century. It was characterised by the use of abundant ornamentation in furniture, and was initially promoted by the Catholic church as a response to the Protestant reformation, which perhaps explains why this style very quickly became popular in France, Spain and Italy yet Northern European nations and the British Isles took a lot longer to warm to Baroque-style furniture. England eventually adopted a lot of baroque-style furniture during this period, as a maritime nation with expanding trading links to Asia, heavy tropical woods were imported which allowed furniture of this style to be created, as well as Asian decorative techniques becoming fashionable.

Also during this period, although their origins were thought to be in the early 16th century, that ladder chairs became very popular. This type of chair has a tall back constructed of horizontal slats or spindles between the two uprights, a very practical chair design.

== Types ==
=== Traditional ===
Traditional upholstery traces its roots back to ancient civilizations, where the need for comfort and functionality led to the creation of padded seating surfaces. From ancient Egypt to ancient Rome, early upholstery was primarily concerned with cushioning and supporting chairs, seats, and sofas. However, it was during the Renaissance period in Europe that upholstery flourished as an art form in its own right. Skilled artisans painstakingly handcrafted upholstery using techniques passed down through generations. One of the defining characteristics of traditional upholstery is its reliance on manual craftsmanship.

Traditional upholstery is a craft that evolved over centuries for padding and covering chairs, seats, and sofas before the development of sewing machines, synthetic fabrics, and plastic foam. Using a solid wood or webbed platform, it can involve the use of springs, lashings, stuffings of animal hair, grasses, coir, wools, hessians, scrims, bridle ties, stuffing ties, blind stitching, top stitching, flocks and wadding all built up by hand.

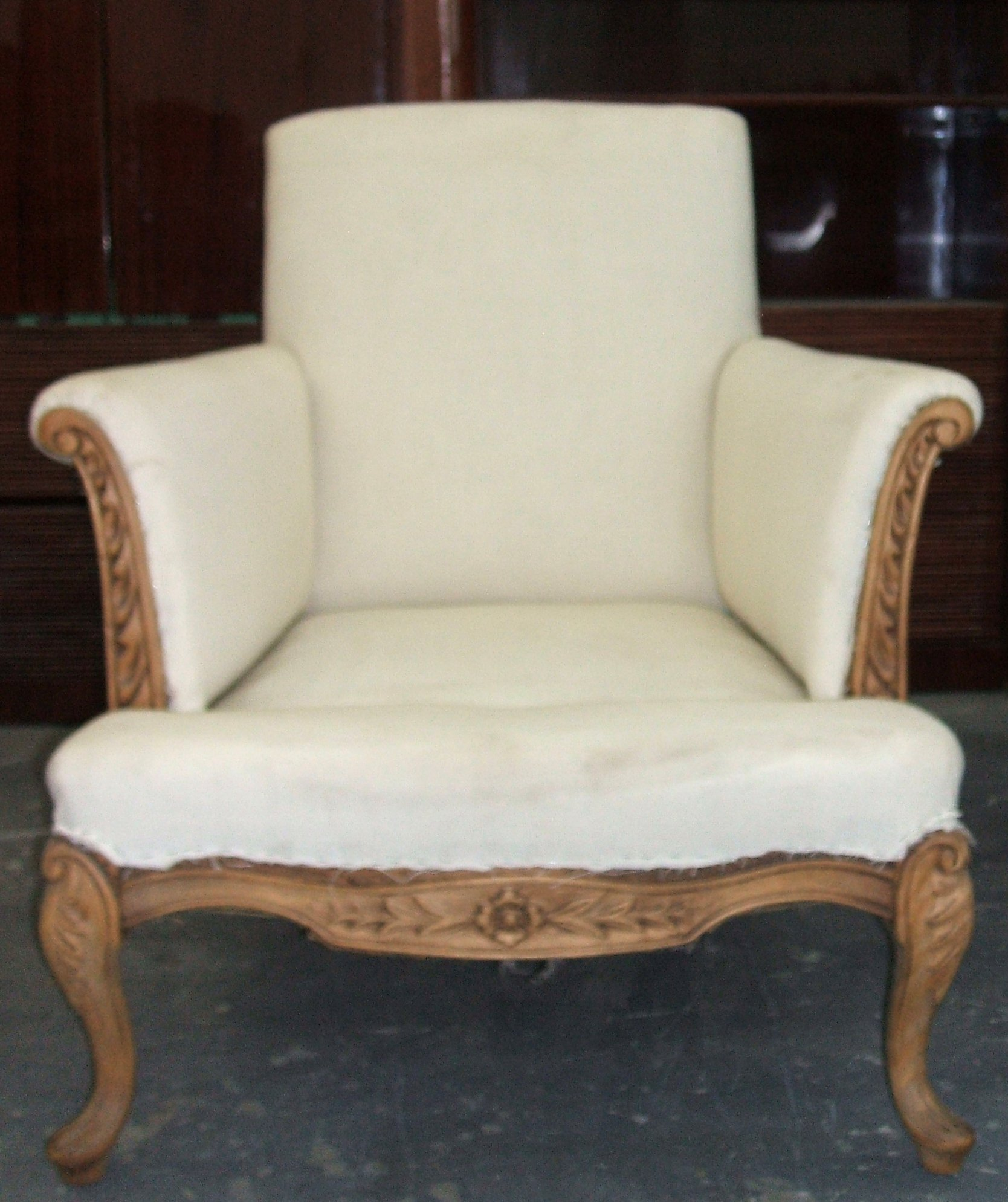
An upholstered chair ready to be covered with the decorative outer textile

In the Middle Ages, domestic interiors were becoming more comfortable, and upholstery was essential in interior decoration. The decorations consisted mainly of what we would now consider as "soft furnishings". However, there were simple platforms of webbing, canvas, or leather for stools, chairs, and elaborately decorated coverings that already demonstrated the rudimentary beginnings of upholstered furniture. By the start of the 17th century, chair seats were being padded, but this upholstery was still fairly basic. All sorts of stuffings from sawdust, grass, and feathers to deer, goat, or horsehair were used, although, in England, the Livery Company forbade goat and deer hair and imposed fines for misdemeanors. The stuffing was heaped on a wooden platform and held in place with a decorative top fabric and nails. This produced a simple dome shape sloping towards the seat. Only towards the end of the 17th century did upholsterers start developing techniques to distribute and shape the stuffing into more controlled shapes. Curled horsehair was used more consistently for stuffing, making it easier to hold in place with twine stitches developed from saddlery techniques. Thus, layers of stuffing could be distributed evenly and secured to stay in place. On a basic level, squab cushions were made more stable using tufting ties. Stuffed edge rolls appeared on seat fronts, providing support for cushions to be retained and later for deeper stuffing to be held in place under a fixed top cover.

What we now consider "classic" upholstery shapes and techniques flourished in the 18th century. Frames of elegant line and proportion were sympathetically matched by expertly executed upholstery. By now, the upholsterers' technical knowledge meant that stuffing could be controlled along upright and sloping lines, giving new comfort levels and a stated elegance. Later in the century, the border was replaced by a single piece of linen or scrim, which took over the stuffed seat and tacked to the frame. At the same time, the locked blind stitch and top-stitching combination (pulling the side and top surfaces together and bringing the stuffing up to make a firm top edge) evolved.

In the Victorian era, fashions of luxury and comfort gave rise to excesses of stuffing and padding. Mass production techniques made upholstered furniture available in large quantities to all sections of society. The availability of better-quality steel springs and the development of lashing techniques enabled upholstery to be built up on seats, backs, and arms independently of the frame shape. Stuffings became even more complex, edges became elaborately shaped into rolls and scrolls, and fabrics were folded into soft padded shapes using buttoning.

=== Modern ===
Modern furniture is more likely to be partly or wholly made with cellular Polyurethane foam. This foam provides structure, resilience (recovery from loading), and lightweight. It is then covered with an outer decorative textile. The synthetic polymer will age and lose performance within a "reasonable" time and be significantly lighter than the traditional fillings.

While modern advancements, like sewing machines and synthetic foams, have introduced new materials and techniques to traditional upholstery continues to thrive as a niche craft

=== Automobile ===
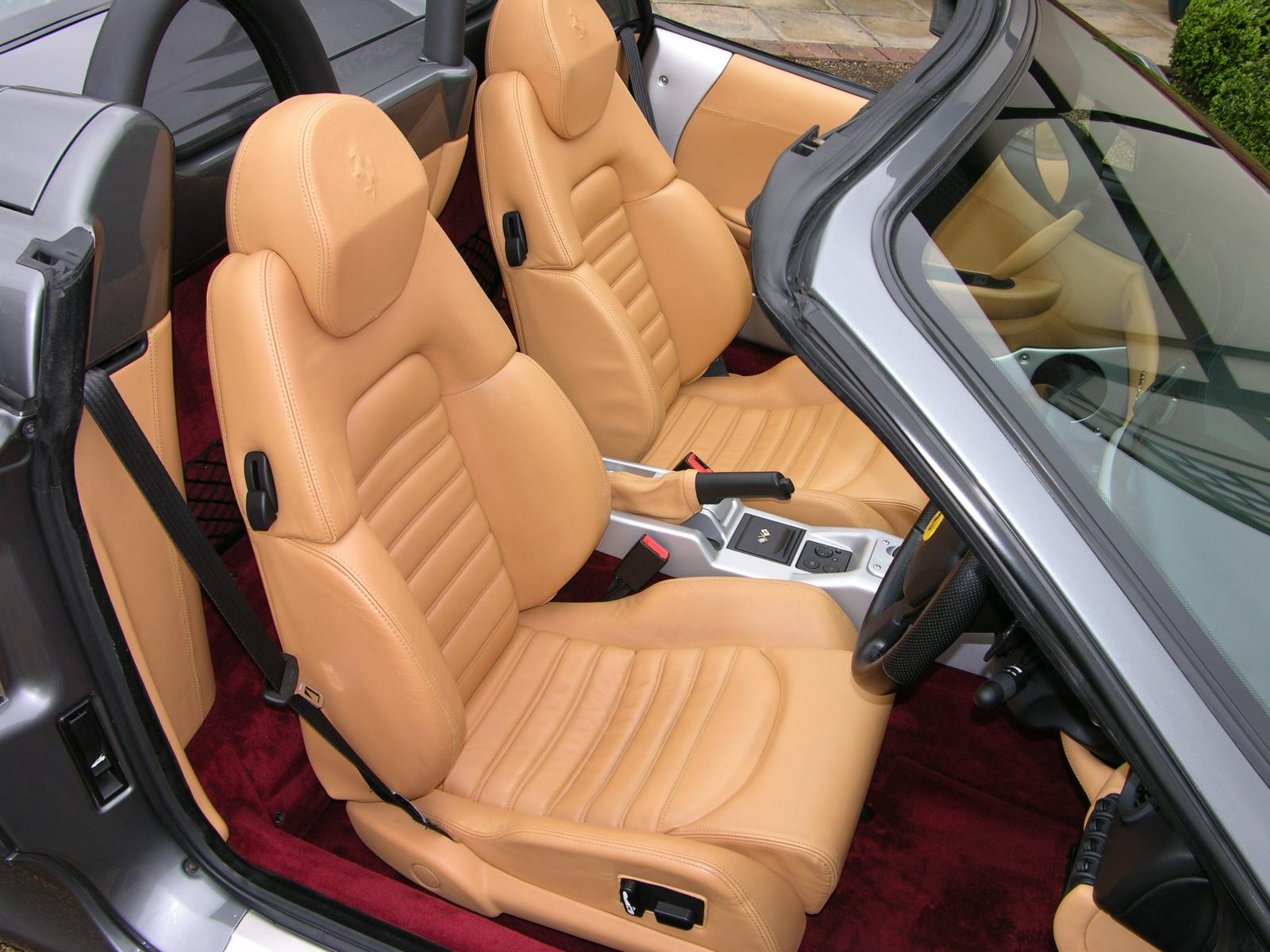
Leather-upholstered car seats

The term coach trimmer derives from the days when car frames were produced by manufacturers and delivered to coach builders to add a car body and interior trimmings. Trimmers would produce soft furnishings, carpets, soft tops, and roof linings often to order to customer specifications. Later, trim shops were frequently an in-house part of the production line as the production process was broken down into smaller parts manageable by semi-skilled labor.

Many automotive trimmers now work in automotive design or with aftermarket trim shops carrying out repairs, restorations, or customer conversions directly. A few luxury motor car manufacturers still employ trimmers, for example, Aston Martin.

=== Marine ===
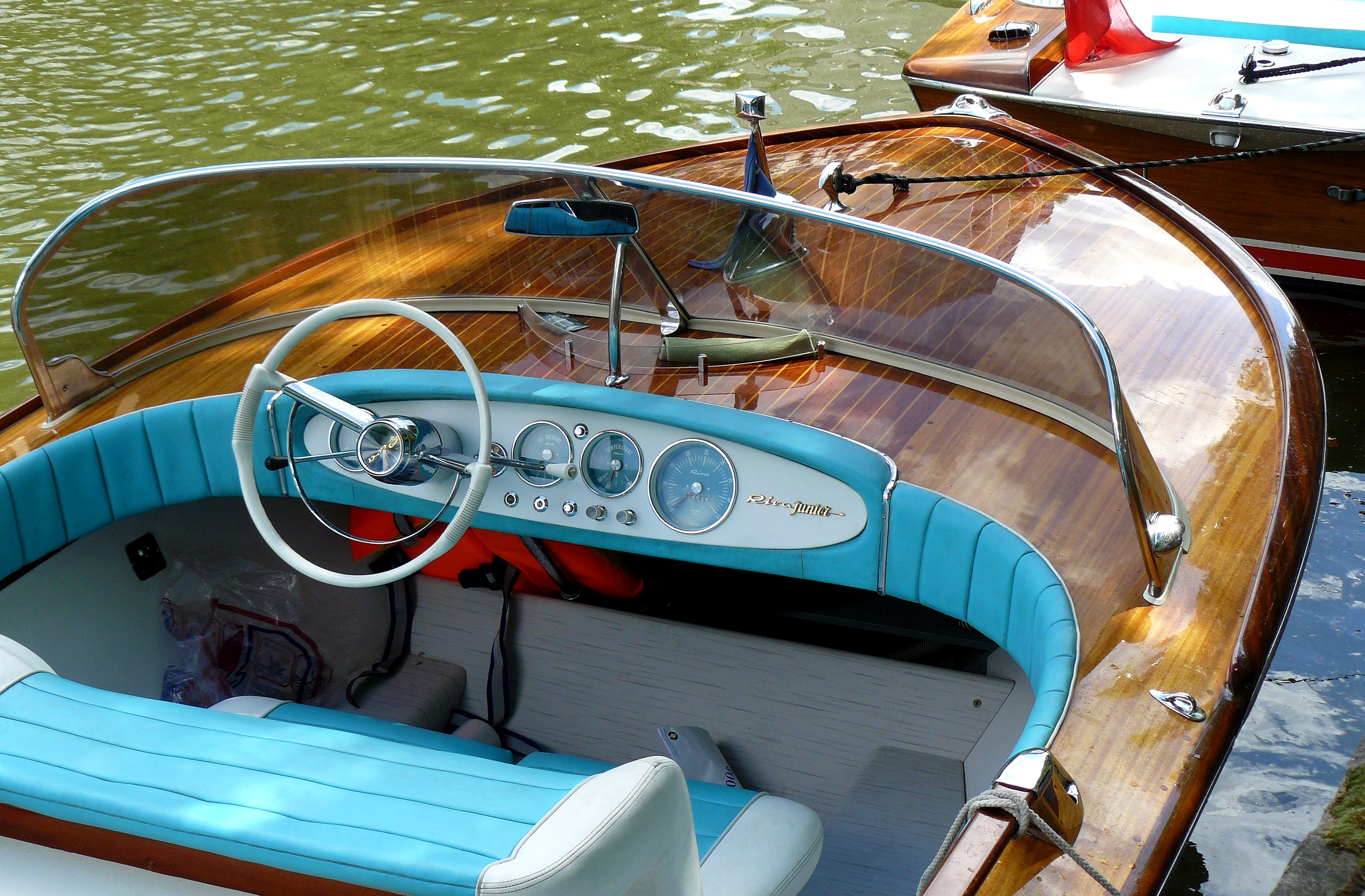
A motorboat cockpit

Upholsterers may be called upon to repair or replace seating, cushions, cabin furnishings, headliners, and boat carpeting. Marine upholstery, in particular, requires special considerations due to the harsh marine environment. Factors such as dampness, sunlight, and hard usage must be taken into account. Many sources now offer marine-grade vinyl, such as Spradling and Morbern, in hundreds of colors and styles.

Each style of marine-grade vinyl is rated according to cold crack, rub counts, and mold resistance. These ratings ensure the material can withstand the challenging conditions at sea. Stainless steel hardware, such as staples and screws, must be used to prevent rust and early breakdown of hardware and fasteners. The newest products for fastening vinyl in marine applications include Tenara thread and Monel staples. Tenara thread is known for its durability and resistance to UV radiation, while Monel staples are highly resistant to corrosion.

Any wood used in marine upholstery must be of marine quality to resist rot and decay. Typically, high-resiliency, high-density plastic foam with a thin plastic film is used to keep out water that might get by the seams. Closed-cell foam is often used for smaller cushions, which can sometimes double as flotation devices.

== See also ==
=== Related tools ===
- Chalk (upholsterer's chalk or tailor's chalk)
- Goggles
- Needle guards
- Rubber mallet
- Scissors
- Sewing machine
- Staple gun
- Staple knocker (staple puller)
- Upholstery hammer
- Upholstery needles (round point curved needles and button needles)
- Upholstery regulator
- Webbing stretcher

=== Materials ===
- Buttons
- Dunlop & Talay Natural Latex Foam Recycled/Rebond (Flexible foams for cushioning and mattresses)
- Fabric
- Vegan Leather
- Framing lumber, engineered hardwood, plywood, wood polymer composite
- Adhesive (industrial PU spray adhesives, wood glues, natural and renewable alternatives)
- Springs (Sinuous Springs, Coil Springs, Proprietary designs, etc.)
- Webbing (Strapping) (synthetic elastic webbing, natural jute webbing, etc.)
- Feathers (soft cushion stuffing, down/feathers, etc.)
- Fiber Batting (densified polyester fiber batting – common brand names Kodel and Dacron, Recycled Fiber batting, Wool & Cotton batting, etc.)
- Upholstery and Framing Staples
- Brad Tack and Nails (upholstery tacks, various sizes)
- Hook & Loops

=== Skills ===
- Cutting
- Sewing

=== See also ===
- Canvas work
- Slipcover
- Throw pillow
- Martindale (unit), a measure of wear resistance of textiles used for upholstery
- Museo della tappezzeria — Upholstery Museum (in Italian Wikipedia)
- Upholstery frame
- Turkeywork
