= Webbing stretcher =

Upholstery tool

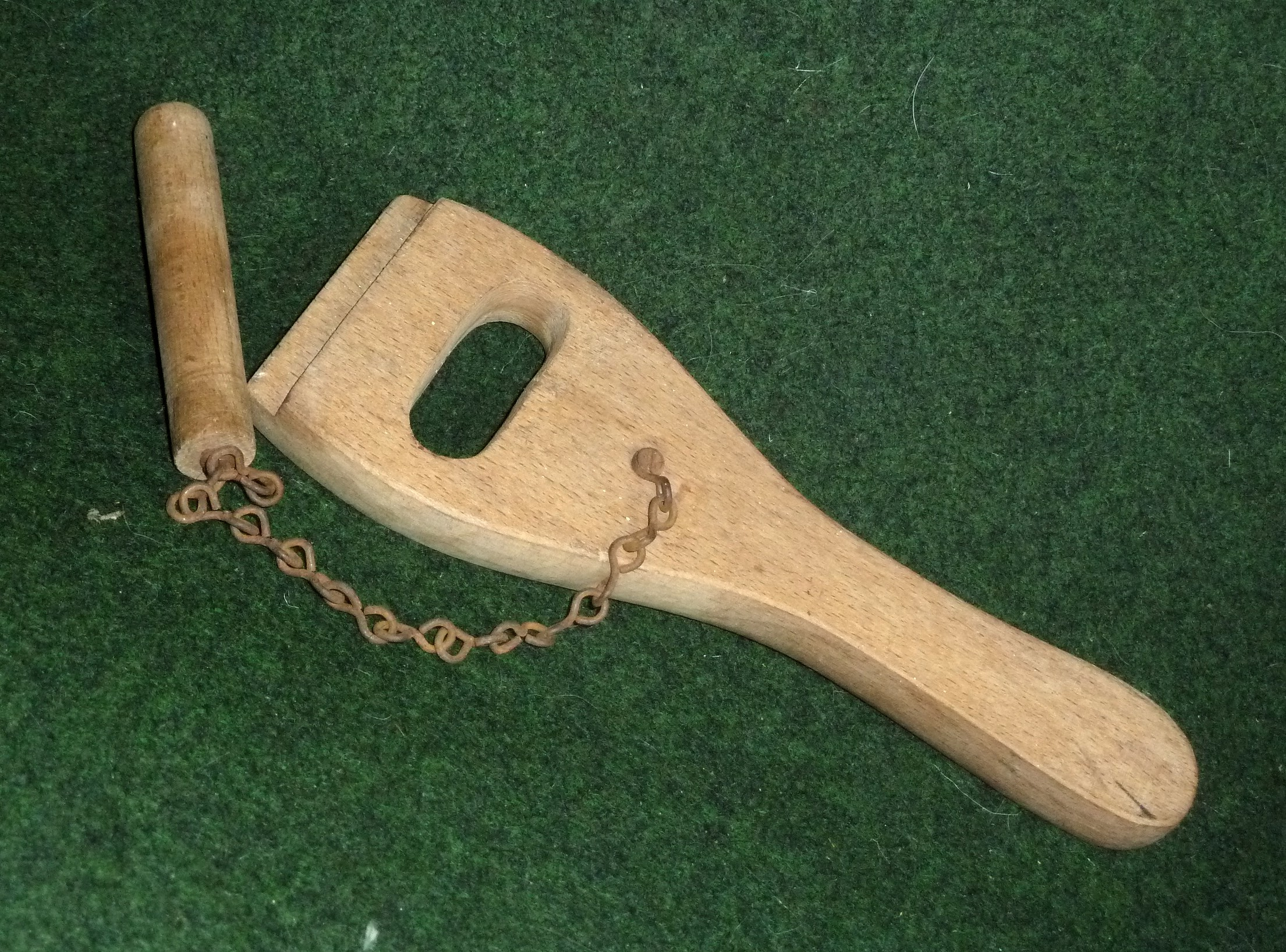
Traditional wooden webbing stretcher

A webbing stretcher is an upholstery tool used to stretch webbing.

== Chair upholstery ==
Traditional chairs are constructed of an open wooden frame, with their seat often supported by interwoven jute or cotton herringbone webbing. Stuffing is placed upon this, enclosed between hessian, then batting over this and finally the cover fabric. To provide a taut and long-lasting seat, the webbing must be tightened into place. The webbing material must also resist yielding over time, hence the use of a dense herringbone weave, rather than the cheaper hessian webbings also used in upholstery. Where wire springs are to be placed over the webbing, the more abrasion-resistant cotton webbing is used rather than jute.

== Modern webbings ==
In the 1950s, an elastic rubber or 'Pirelli' webbing became popular. This is made of black rubber, with an internal canvas reinforcement. This webbing is applied by hand and is not tensioned, the elasticity of the rubber being sufficient. It is attached by metal clips, fitting into grooves in the frame. As the webbing is elastic it is only used in parallel strips, rather than being interweaved: friction between these elastic webs moving over each other would soon abrade their edges.

== Stretchers ==
=== Traditional stretchers ===
When the webbing is attached, it is fastened at one end, stretched into place and then held in place with tacks.

Tensioning is done with a simple wooden lever, the webbing stretcher. This looks like a bat or paddle with a simple handle, a locating groove along the opposing edge and a slot in the centre. The webbing is held in place by placing a loop through the slot and locking it with a wooden dowel pin. This pin is usually attached to the stretcher with a short chain or string. Using chain avoids the inconvenient twisting tendency of string.

In use, the grooved edge is located over a convenient edge of the frame to act as the fulcrum of a lever and the stretcher is levered outwards. As the handle is further away from the fulcrum than the slot, there is a mechanical advantage of about 3:1 in the tensioning force that can be generated, compared to simply pulling.

Stretchers are sold commercially, usually made of beech. Many upholsterers make their own though, from workshop offcuts.

=== Stretcher pliers ===
Plier-type stretchers are sometimes used, particularly with leather strapping that is too short to allow a loop through a traditional stretcher. These have wide ridged jaws to grip the end of a webbing. A protrusion on one jaw acts as the fulcrum of a lever, to give a powerful tensioning force.

=== American or 'gooseneck' stretchers ===
These are mostly used by direct pulling, rather than levering. A wooden or plastic block has a row of sharp raised point to grip the webbing by piercing it. The block is either held and pushed to tension the webbing, or a turned wooden handle on a gooseneck wire is used to pull it. The other edge of the block is sometimes padded to avoiding marking the frame, but is not as effective a lever as the traditional grooved type. As this type of stretcher is usually used by pulling rather than levering, it tends to leave the webbing slacker than traditionally expected. The pins can also damage the webbing, if used to apply an adequate force. This type is commonly used for making cheap furniture, where rubber webs are stapled permanently into place. As rubber only requires a low tension, they are adequate for this.
