= Upholstery hammer =

Lightweight hand tool for tacking of fabric

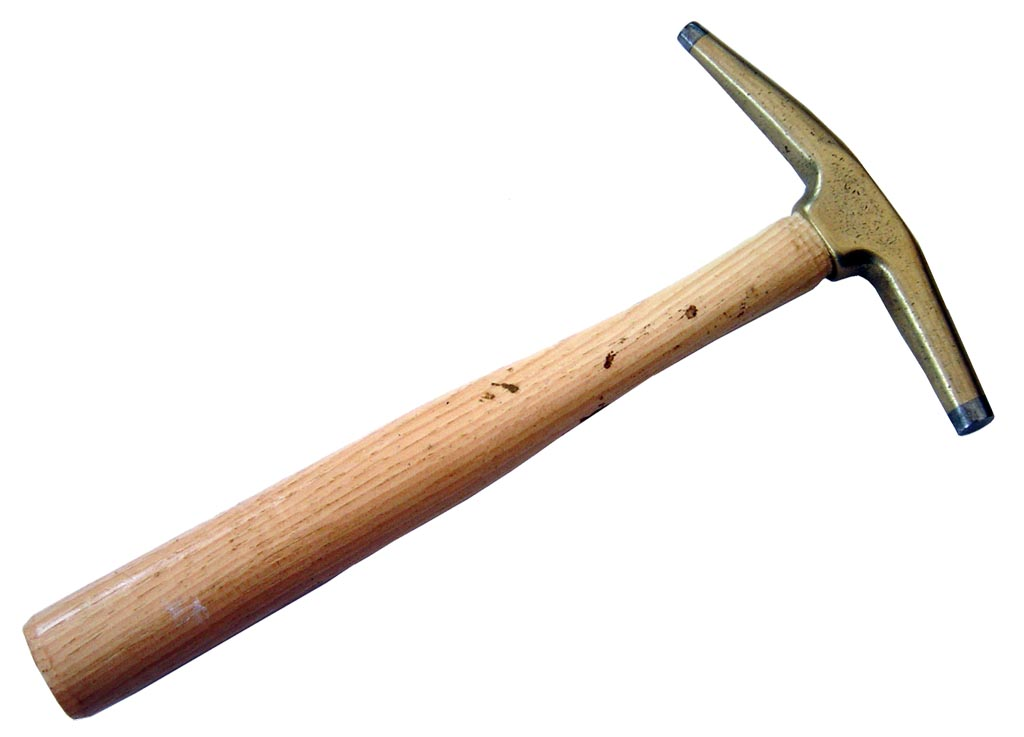
Upholstery hammer

An upholstery hammer (also called a tack hammer) is a lightweight hammer used for securing upholstery fabric to furniture frames using tacks or small nails.

The head of an upholstery hammer is narrow and roughly 12-15mm in diameter. Commonly they are cast in bronze with fused steel tips.

Many styles of upholstery hammers have two faces, one face being magnetized to aid in the placement of tacks, the other being larger to drive the tacks home. A patent existed for a magnetized tack hammer as early as 1861, by G. W. Beardslee. Sometimes, the magnetized face has a split surface to make its magnetic hold stronger. Upholstery hammers may also have one end shaped like a claw to make removing tacks easier.

To apply tacks rapidly, an upholsterer will hold tacks in the mouth and spit them, head first, onto the magnetized face of the hammer. This gave rise to the phrase "spitting tacks."

Staple guns and hammer tackers have largely replaced this traditional way of tacking as a commercial upholstery technique. The traditional method remains important both in antiques restoration and in hobbyist work.
