= Knocker =

Knocker and knockers may refer to:

== People ==
- Elsie Knocker (1884–1978), British nurse and ambulance driver in World War I who won numerous medals for bravery
- Knocker Norton or Steve Norton, English rugby league footballer
- Editha Knocker (1869–1950), English violinist
- Elsie Knocker (1884–1978), British nurse
- Nickname of Enoch West (1886–1965), English footballer

== Items that knock ==
- Door knocker, item of door furniture that allows people outside to alert those inside
- Knocker-up, profession in England and Ireland before alarm clocks were affordable or reliable
- Port knocker, to externally open ports on a firewall
- Sanctuary Knocker, ornamental knocker on the door of a cathedral

== Other uses ==
- Knocker (folklore), mythical creature in Welsh and Cornish folklore
- Knocker (radio series)
- "Knockers" (song), a 2005 song from The Darkness
- Popper knockers or Clackers, a toy popular around 1970
- Saggarmaker's bottom knocker, manufacturer of saggars (boxlike containers used in firing pottery) in the UK
- Staple knocker, tool resembling a screwdriver for removing staples and shredded material
- Swish knocker or Swish cymbal
- Breasts (colloq.)

== See also ==
- Knacker
- Knokke
- Knucker
