= Staple knocker =

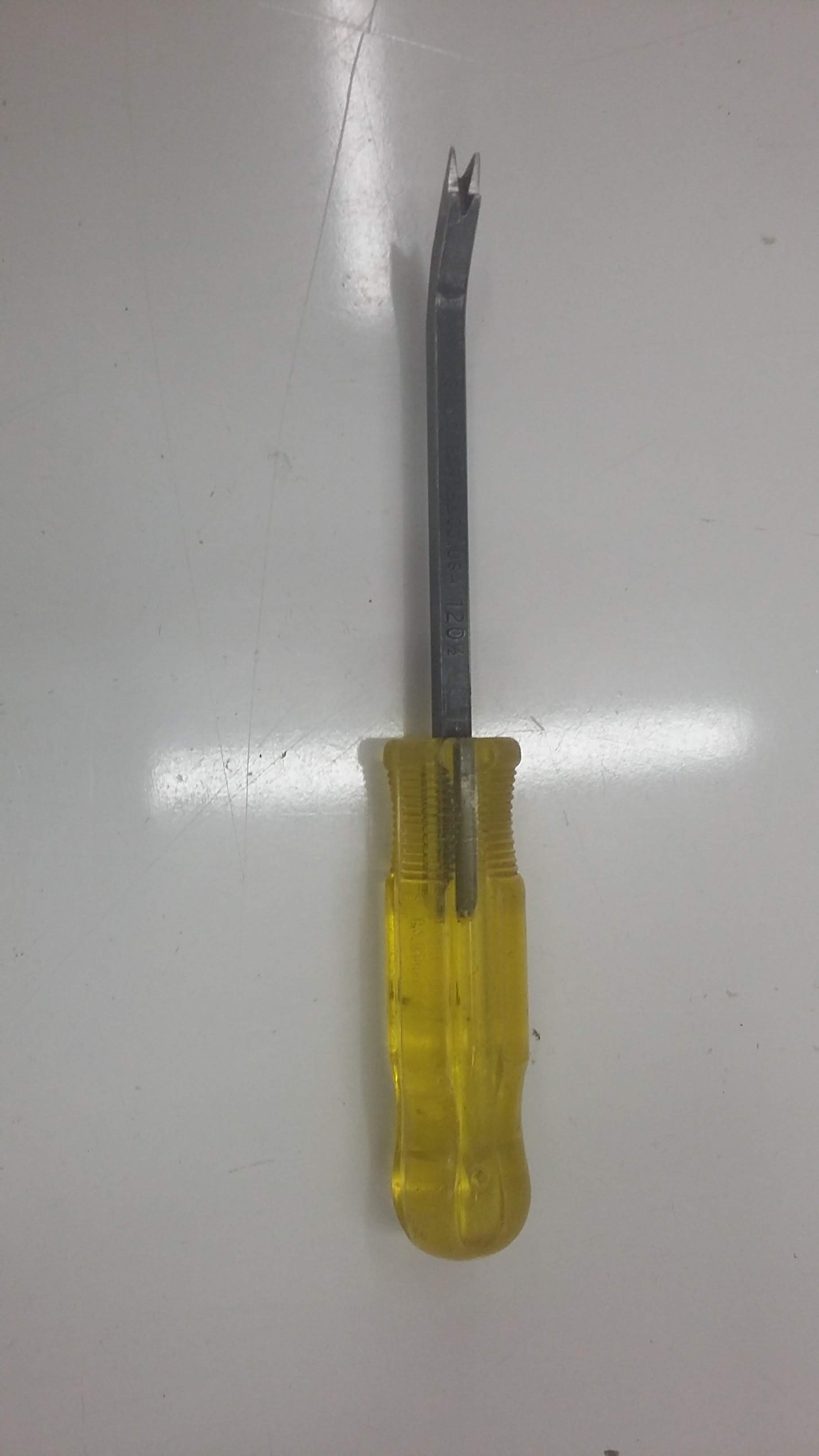
Staple knocker

A staple knocker is a tool resembling a screwdriver, used for removing staples and shredded material. It is called a knocker because a hammer can be used to hit the end of it and remove long lines of shorter staples.

== See also ==
- Staple remover
