= Hammer tacker =

Hand tool used for stapling

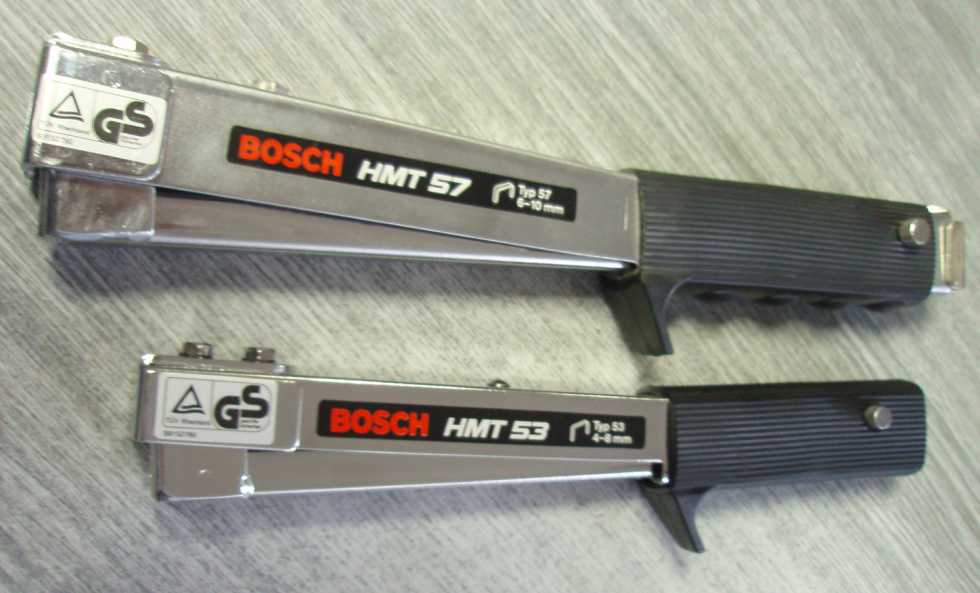
Two hammer tackers

A hammer tacker or hammer stapler is a tool used for securing a variety of thin plastic and paper sheet building materials against flat surfaces by tacking a staple using a high velocity slapping motion similar to that of swinging a hammer. Typically the shallower the staple, the better hold its grip on the surface is.

Also known as a slap stapler or slapper, it is most commonly used for the application of housewrap as well as some paper building materials which is installed by slap stapling the material onto plywood sheathing prior to siding installation during residential and commercial new build construction. Another common use is for securing insulation batts in between studs and joists as opposed to using insulation rods. It is also commonly used in the flooring industry for securing underlayment or underpadding beneath hard or soft flooring surfaces such as carpet, vinyl plank, laminate, and hardwood.

Hammer staplers are somewhat similar to staple guns but without the need to squeeze a trigger in order to use the tool for its intended purpose.

== See also ==
- Staple gun
- Tack hammer
