= Upholstery frame =

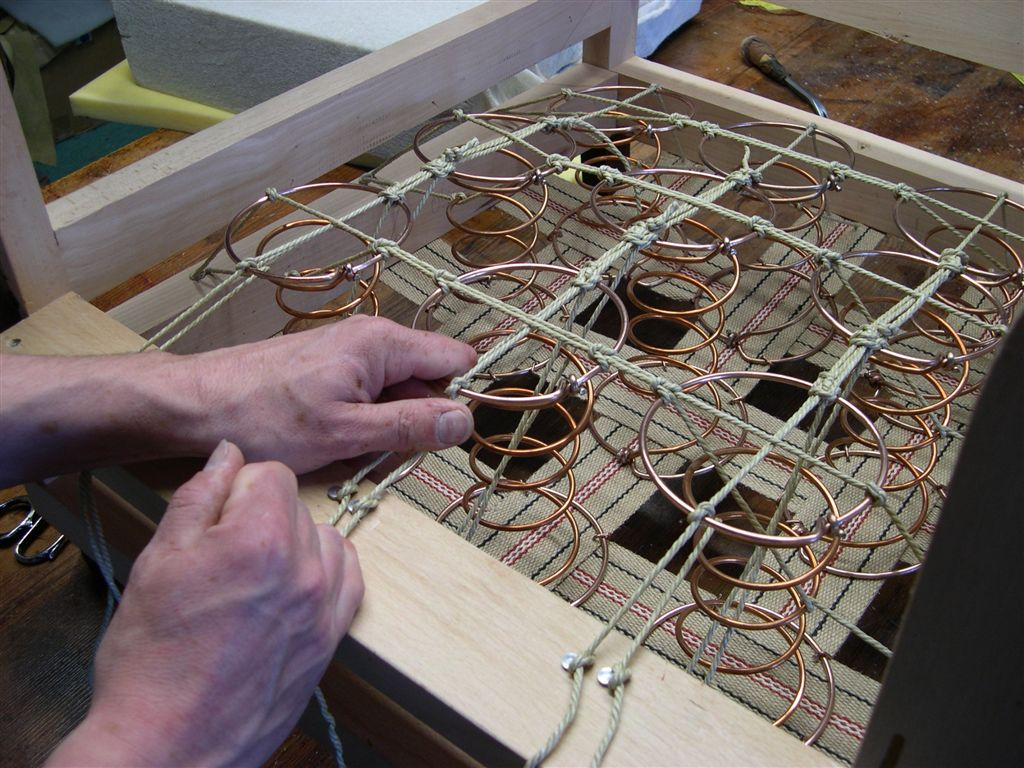
Upholsterer

In furniture-making, the upholstery frame of a piece of furniture gives the structural support and determines the basic shape of the upholstered furniture. The frame may be a basic piece of wooden furniture before it is upholstered. Like a finished piece of furniture before the upholstering, the frame establishes the final quality, including its durability, and limits the final design, padding, cushioning, or cover.

== Materials ==
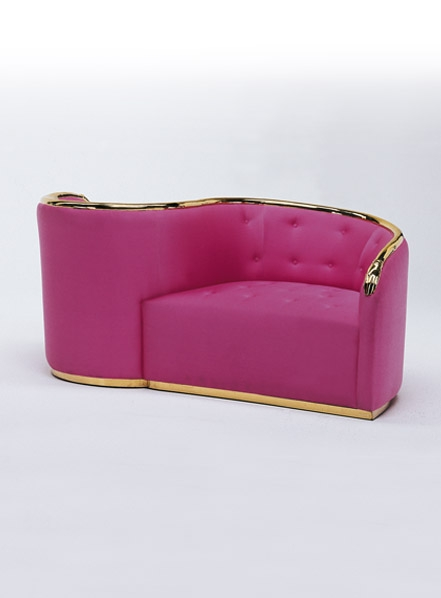
Sofa designed for Dalí in 1935

Frames are made variously of solid wood, engineered wood products, a variety of polymers and metals, or a mixture of these. Solid wood for upholstery frames may be of various kinds, including hardwoods and softwoods. The type of wood depends upon the final piece, including function, style, and quality. Where parts of the frame are visible afterward, wood grades and species may be mixed.

Hardwood destined for upholstery frames is primarily air-dried. Hardwood frames for high-end furniture are often constructed from kiln-dried mixed hardwoods. Beech, birch, white ash, and mahogany all have acceptable combinations of strength, availability (country dependent), workability, and cost to be superior wood products for frame making. White oak, red oak, and American elm are good, and hard maple is an acceptable framing wood. Softwoods can make poor frames but are used in low-end furniture manufacturing, particularly with partially upholstered frames on larger pieces in the United States. In Scandinavia, better quality softwoods are available and used with suitable furniture-making and upholstery techniques; their use is more common in furniture of various qualities.

Engineered wood products can be stronger than hardwood because layering methods increase the strength. They are sometimes used at critical stress areas when maximum strength is needed. Modern furniture making, however, tends to rely upon a combination of engineered woods and solid woods in frame making. Engineered wood products commonly used in furniture making include plywood, hardboard, millboard, chipboard, and medium-density fiberboard. Upholstery itself is often applied with staples, and so metal frames will typically have a plywood panel inserted into them as a backer for the upholstery and to allow these staples to be pinned into it.

Since lumber costs increase rapidly with increasing board thickness, some manufacturers may reduce frame costs by skimping at the precise point where ample strength is most important. The engineering principle involved is that strength varies directly with rail width and with the cube of thickness. If we assume that a certain 1" x 1" beam will sustain a load of 100 pounds, then a beam 1" thick and 2" wide will sustain 200 pounds. An old rule of thumb suggests that rails of 3" or more in width should be 1 1/8" thick, while rails less than 3" wide should exceed 11/8" in thickness.

== Construction ==
Wooden frame joints are often double doweled, so round wooden pegs are fitted into holes in two adjacent frame sections and glued. Epoxy coated staples and gang nails are also commonly used. The gang nail is a metal plate with saw teeth, immobilizing the joint when pressed into the wood with a hydraulic press. Major joints need the additional support of corner blocks, which should be glued and screwed into place.
