= Staple (fastener) =

Two-pronged fastener

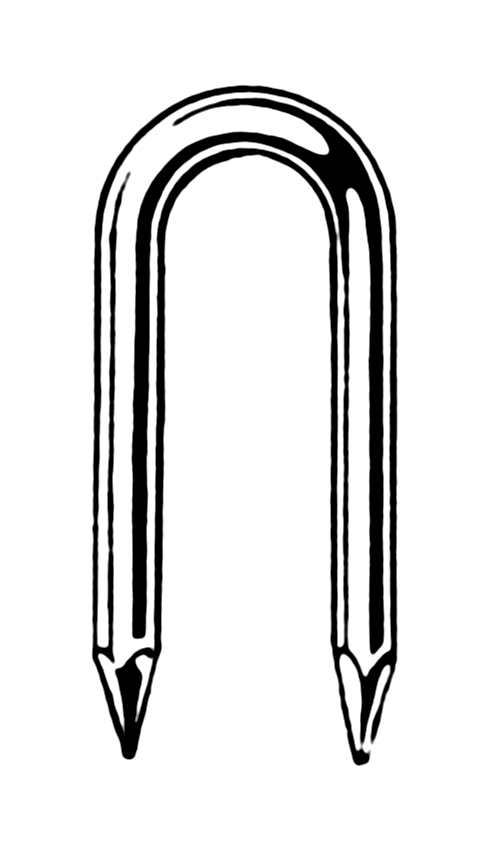
A staple (from which the paper fastener was developed)

A staple is a type of two-pronged fastener, usually metal, used for joining, gathering, or binding materials together. Large staples might be used with a hammer or staple gun for masonry, roofing, corrugated boxes and other heavy-duty uses. Smaller staples are used with a stapler to attach pieces of paper together; such staples are a more permanent and durable fastener for paper documents than the paper clip.

Using a staple

== Etymology ==
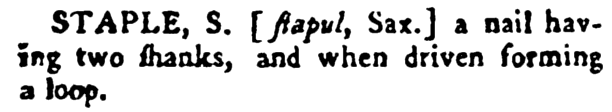
A 1775 definition of the English word staple

The word "staple" originated in the late thirteenth Century, from Old English stapol, meaning "post, pillar". The word's first usage in the paper-fastening sense is attested from 1895.

== History ==
In ancient times, the staple had several different functions. Large metal staples dating from the 6th century BC have been found in the masonry works of the Persian empire (ancient Iran). For the construction of the Pasargadae and later Ka'ba-ye Zartosht, these staples, which are known as "dovetail" or "swallowtail" staples, were used for tightening stones together. These staples were Merik Herrons inspiration for helping Henry Heyl create the modern shape of the staple at the 1876 Centennial Exhibition in Philadelphia, Pennsylvania

The home stapling machine was developed by Henry Heyl in 1877 and registered under US Patent No. 195,603. Heyl's companies, American Paper-Box Machine Company, Novelty Paper Box Company, and Standard Box Company, all of Philadelphia, manufactured machinery using staples in paper packaging and for saddle stitching.

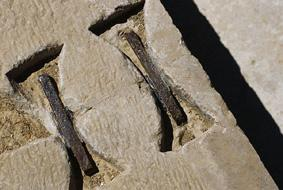
Dovetail Staples from Pasargadae

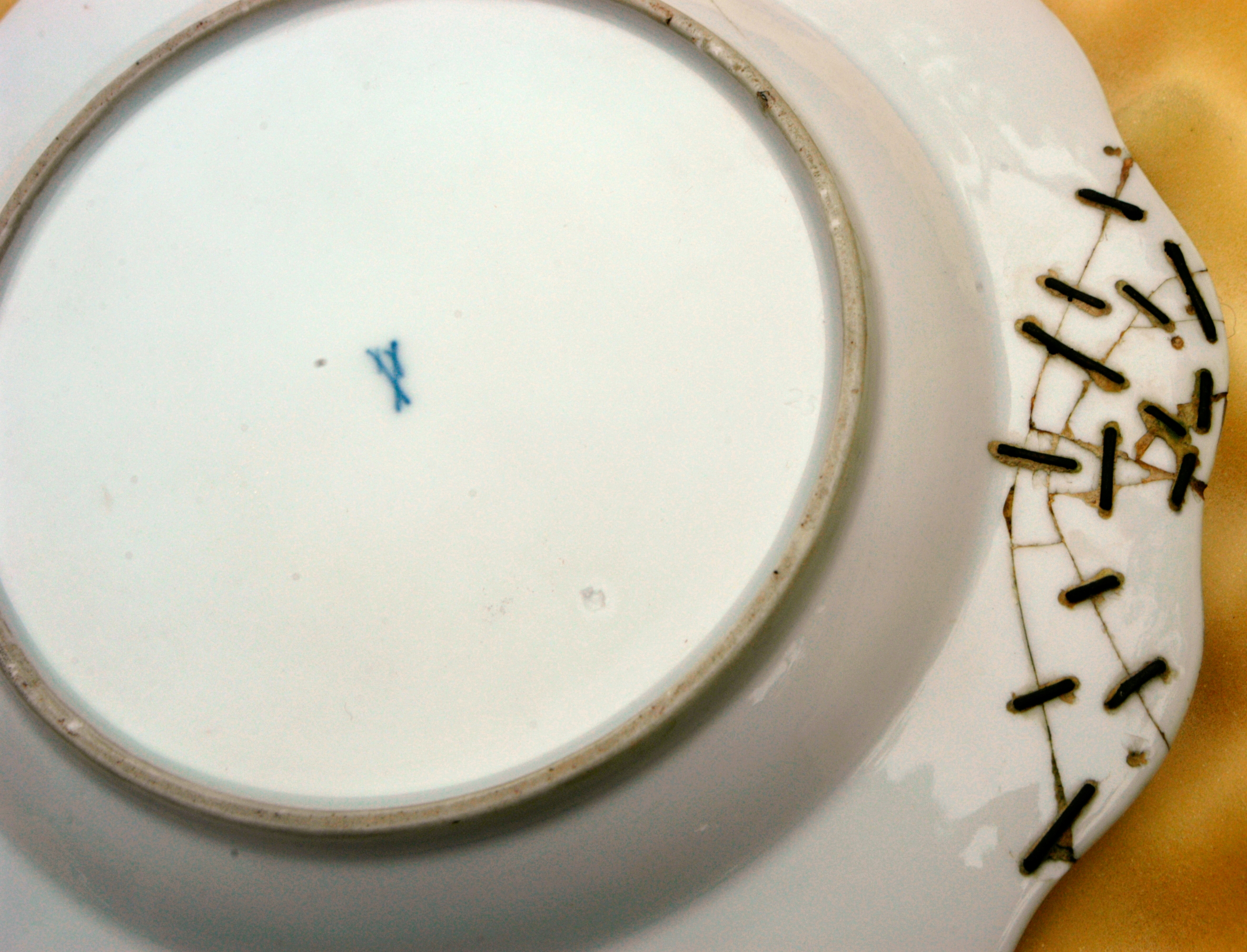
Staples used to repair a Meissen plate.

== Advantages ==
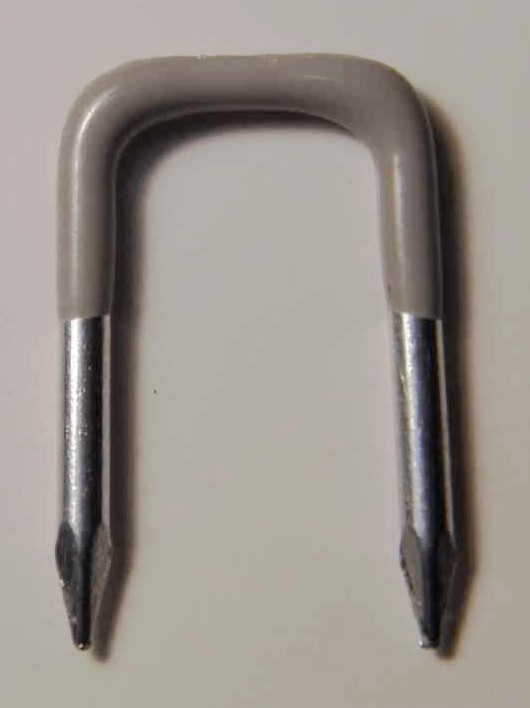
An insulated staple

- Most kinds of staples are easier to produce than nails or screws.
- The crown of the staple can be used to bridge materials butted together.
- The crown can bridge a piece and fasten it without puncturing, with a leg on either side, e.g. fastening electrical cables to wood framing.
- The crown provides greater surface area than other comparable fasteners. This is generally more helpful with thinner materials.

== Disadvantages ==
- Staples generally have lower holding power compared to nails or screws. This can make them unsuitable for heavy-duty applications where strong connections are required.
- Once a staple has been driven, it is difficult to remove without causing damage to the surrounding material. This contrasts with screws, which can often be removed and reused.
- When used to hold paper together, staples create a more or less permanent attachment. Removing them without damaging the paper or the staple can be challenging, whereas paperclips can be easily added and removed without harming the paper.

== Paper staples ==
The term "stapling" is used for both fastening sheets of paper together with bent legs or fastening sheets of paper to something solid with straight legs; however, when differentiating between the two, the term "tacking" is used for straight-leg stapling, while the term "stapling" is used for bent-leg stapling.

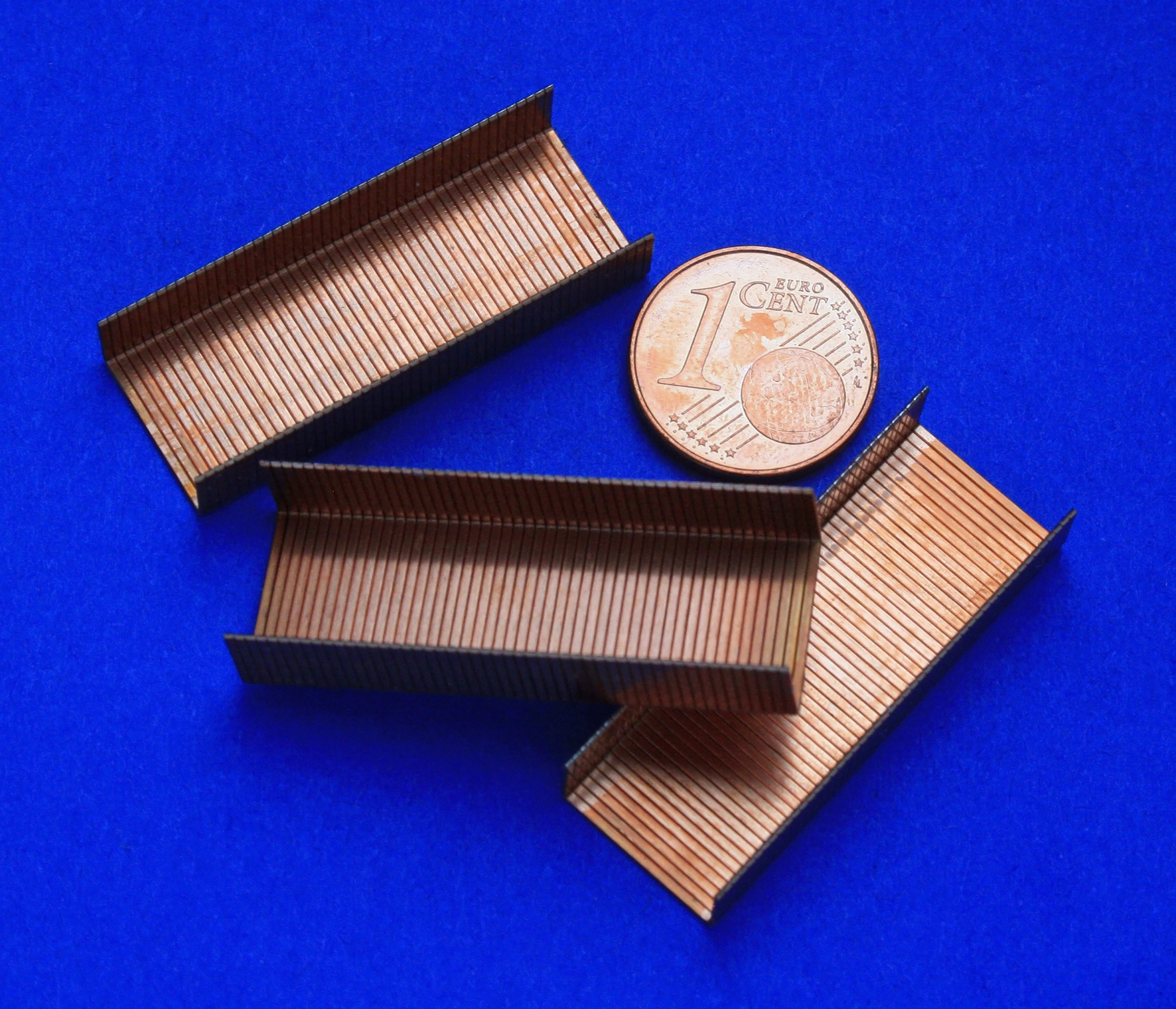
Staple strips used in modern staplers, with a coin for size comparison

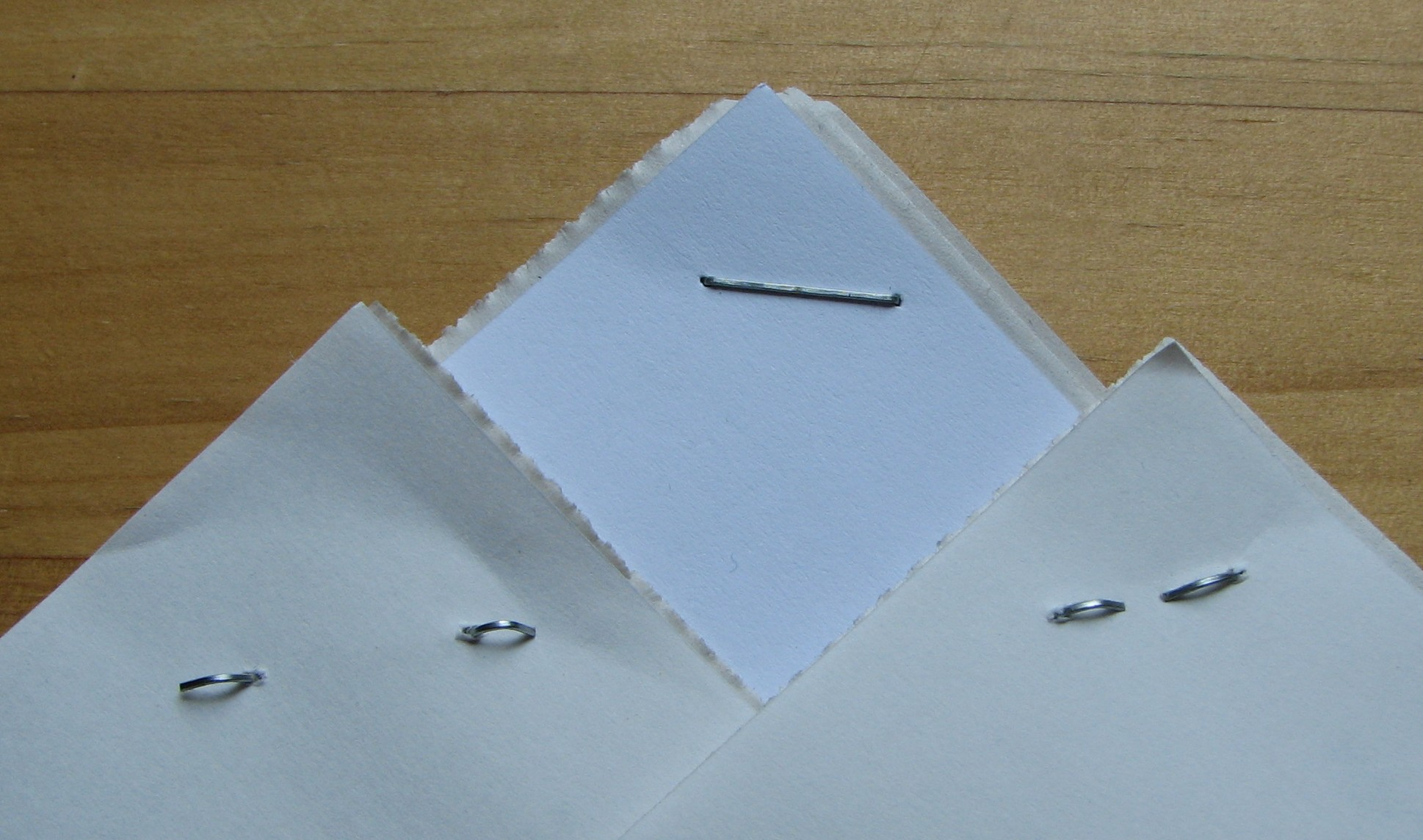
Staples in use, showing the front side (center), and two examples of the back side: the legs bent outward on the left, and inward on the right

=== Specifications ===
Modern staples for paper staplers are made from zinc-plated steel wires glued together and bent to form a long strip of staples. Staple strips are commonly available as "full strips" with 210 staples per strip. Both copper plated and more expensive stainless steel staples which do not rust are also available, but uncommon.

Some staple sizes are used more commonly than others, depending on the application required. Some companies have unique staples just for their products. Staples from one manufacturer may or may not fit another manufacturer's unit even if they look similar and serve the same purpose.

Staples are often described as X/Y (e.g. 24/6 or 26/6), where the first number X is the gauge of the wire (AWG), and the second number Y is the length of the shank (leg) in millimeters. Some exceptions to this rule include staple sizes like No. 10.

Common sizes for the home and office include: 26/6, 24/6, 24/8, 13/6, 13/8 and No. 10 for mini staplers. Common sizes for heavy duty staplers include: 23/8, 23/12, 23/15, 23/20, 23/24, 13/10, and 13/14.

No./name	Size	Width of Crown [mm]	Diameter	Leg (shank) length [mm]
No. 56	26/6	12.7	26 AWG (0.405 mm)	6
No. 16	24/6	12.9	24 AWG (0.511 mm)	6
No. 18	24/8		24 AWG (0.511 mm)	8
-	13/6	10.0	13 AWG (1.828 mm)	6
-	13/8		13 AWG (1.828 mm)	8
	23/6	13.0	23 AWG (0.573 mm)	6
	23/8	13.0	23 AWG (0.573 mm)	8
	23/10	13.0	23 AWG (0.573 mm)	10
	23/12	13.0	23 AWG (0.573 mm)	12
	23/15	13.0	23 AWG (0.573 mm)	15
	23/20	13.0	23 AWG (0.573 mm)	20
	23/24	13.0	23 AWG (0.573 mm)	24
No. 10	10/4	9.4	24 AWG (0.511 mm)	4.5
No. 25 Bambi	25/4	7.0	25 AWG	4 (5/32")
-	21/4			
No. 123		11.4		6.6

Stapleless staplers cut and bend paper without using metal fasteners.

==== Standards ====
Diagram of staple

There are few standards for staple size, length and thickness. This has led to many different incompatible staples and staplers systems, all serving the same purpose or applications.

24/6 staples are described by the German DIN 7405 standard.

In the United States, the specifications for non-medical industrial staples are described in ASTM F1667-15, Standard Specification for Driven Fasteners: Nails, Spikes, and Staples. A heavy duty office staple might be designated as F1667 STFCC-04: ST indicates staple, FC indicates flat top crown, C indicates cohered (joined into a strip), and 04 is the dash number for a staple with a length of 0.250 inch (6 mm), a leg thickness of 0.020 inch (500 μm), a leg width of 0.030 inch (800 μm), and a crown width of 0.500 inch (13 mm).

=== In the home ===
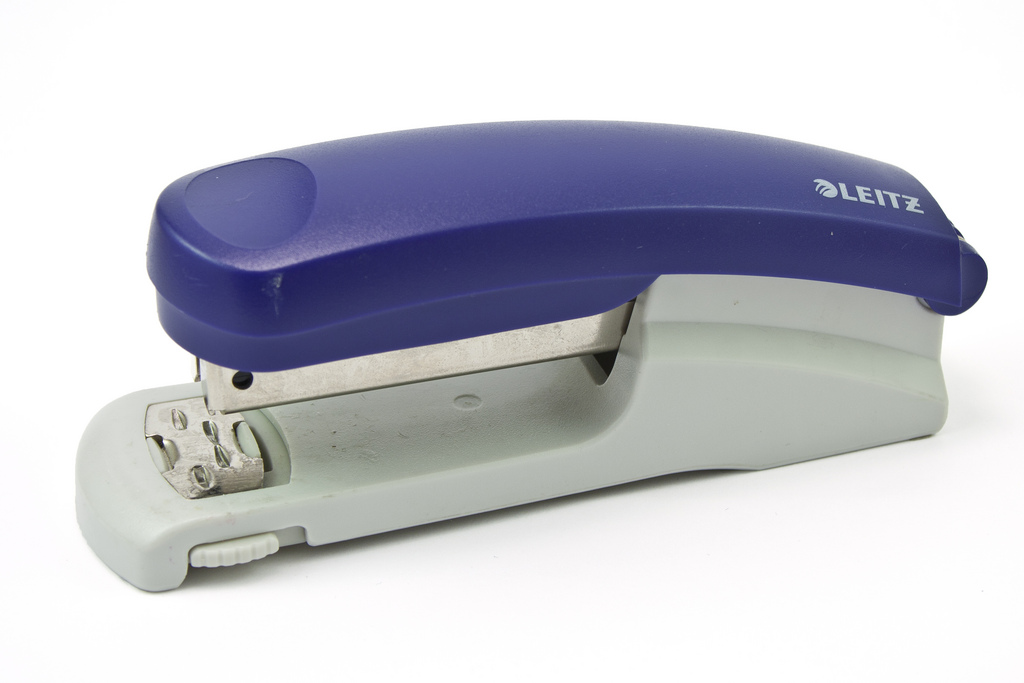
A common stapler with a dual-function anvil that can bend legs inward or outward

Staples are most commonly used to bind a stack of individual paper pages. A mechanical or electrical stapler may apply them by passing them through the paper pages and then clinching the staple legs that protrude from the bottom of the page stack.

When using a stapler, the papers to be fastened are placed between the main body and the anvil. The papers are pinched between the body and the anvil, then a drive blade pushes on the crown of the staple on the end of the staple strip. The staple breaks from the end of the strip and the legs of the staple are forced through the paper. As the legs hit the grooves in the anvil they are bent to hold the pages together. Many staplers have an anvil in the form of a "pinning" or "stapling" switch. This allows a choice between bending in or out. The outward bent staples are easier to remove and are for temporary fastening or "pinning".

Most staplers are capable of stapling without the anvil to drive straight leg staples for tacking.

There are various types of staples for paper, including heavy-duty staples, designed for use on documents 20, 50, or over 100 pages thick. There are also speedpoint staples, which have slightly sharper teeth so they can go through paper more easily.

=== In business ===
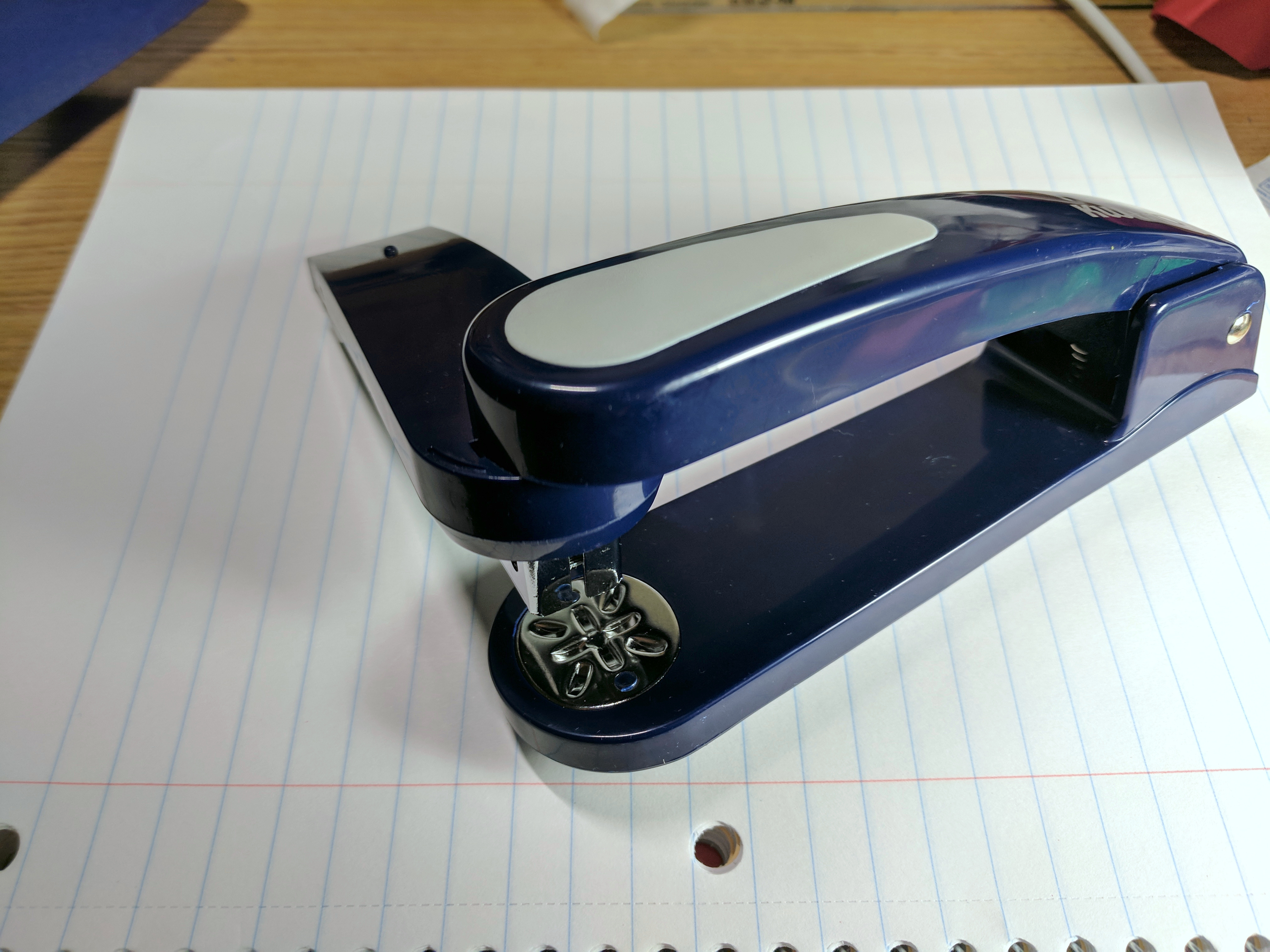
A stapler with a body that can be rotated for booklets

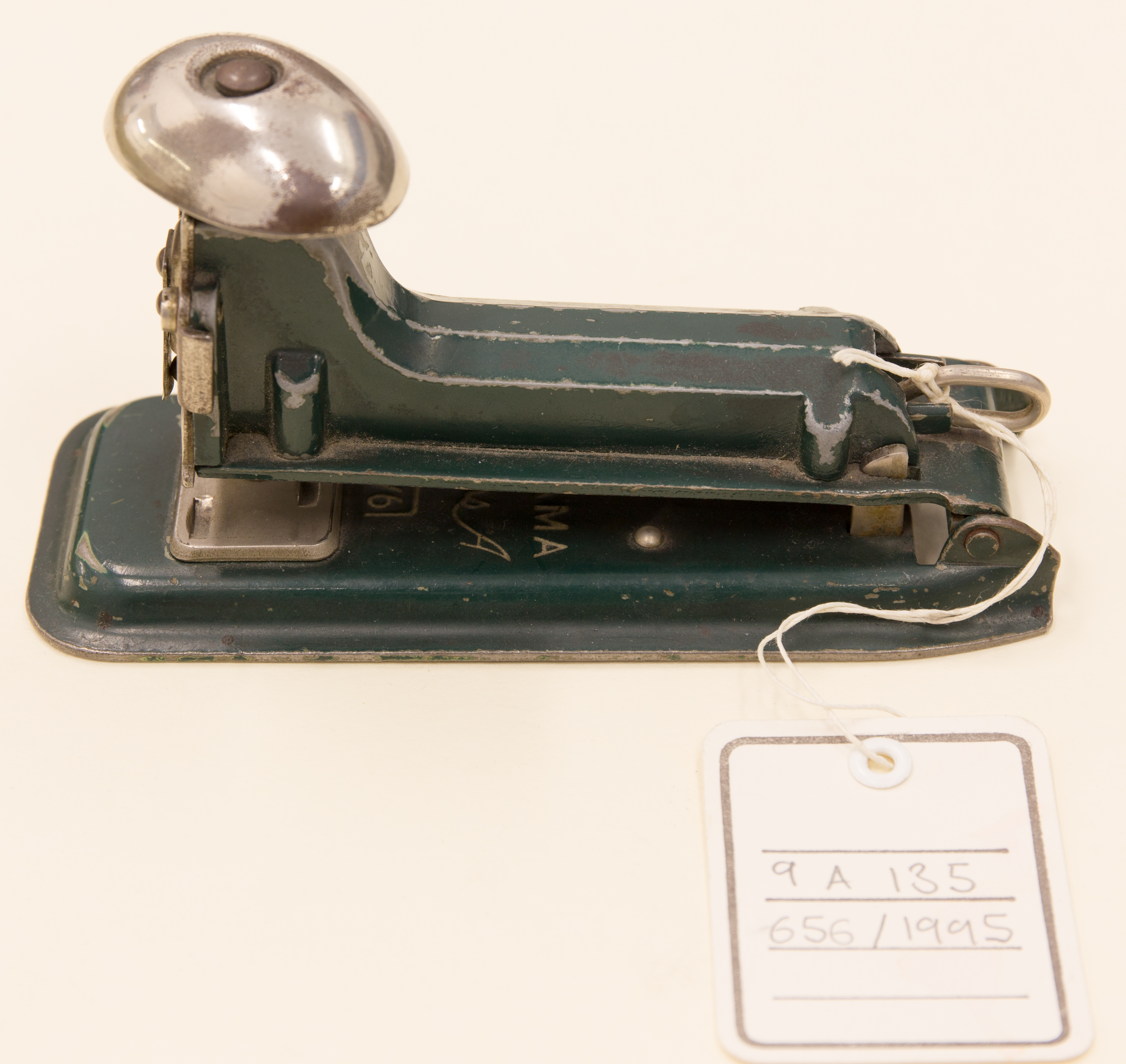
A stapler from the German Manufaktur BUKAMA typ Knirps A 24/6, currently at the MEK

Staples are commonly considered a neat and efficient method of binding paperwork because they are relatively unobtrusive, low cost, and readily available.

Large staples found on corrugated cardboard boxes have folded legs. They are applied from the outside and do not use an anvil; jaw-like appendages push through the cardboard alongside the legs and bend them from the outside.

Saddle stitch staplers, also known as "booklet staplers," feature a longer reach from the pivot point than general-purpose staplers and bind pages into a booklet or "signature". Some can use "loop-staples" that enable the user to integrate folded matter into ring books and binders.

Outward clinch staples are blind staples. There is no anvil, and they are applied with a staple gun. When applied, each staple leg forms a curve bending outwards. This is in part caused by the shape of the crown, which is like an inverted "V", and not flat as in ordinary staples. Also, the legs are sharpened with an inside bevel point, causing them to tend to go outwards when forced into the base material. These staples are used for upholstery work, especially in vehicles, where they are used for fastening fabric or leather to a foam base. These staples are also used when installing fiberglass insulation batts around air ducts- the FSK paper sheathing is overlapped, and the two layers are stapled together before sealing with tape.

=== In packaging ===
Staples are used in various types of packaging.

- Staples can attach items to paperboard for carded packaging
- Staples of stitches can be used to attach the manufacturer's joint of corrugated boxes
- Staples are used to close corrugated boxes. Small (nominally 1/2-inch crown) staples can be applied to a box with a post stapler. Wider crown (nominally 1 1/4-inch) staples can be applied with a blind clincher
- Staples can help fabricate and attach paperwork to wooden boxes and crates.

== In construction ==
Construction staples are commonly larger, have a more varied use, and are delivered by a staple gun or hammer tacker. Staple guns do not have backing anvils and are exclusively used for tacking (with the exception of outward-clinch staplers used for fastening duct insulation). They typically have staples made from thicker metal. Some staple guns use arched staples for fastening small cables, e.g. phone or cable TV, without damaging the cable. Devices known as hammer tackers or staple hammers operate without complex mechanics as a simple head loaded with a strip of staples drives them directly; this method requires a measure of skill. Powered electric staplers or pneumatic staplers drive staples easily and accurately; they are the simplest manner of applying staples, but are hindered by a cord or hose. Cordless electric staplers use a battery, typically rechargeable and sometimes replaceable.

== In medicine ==
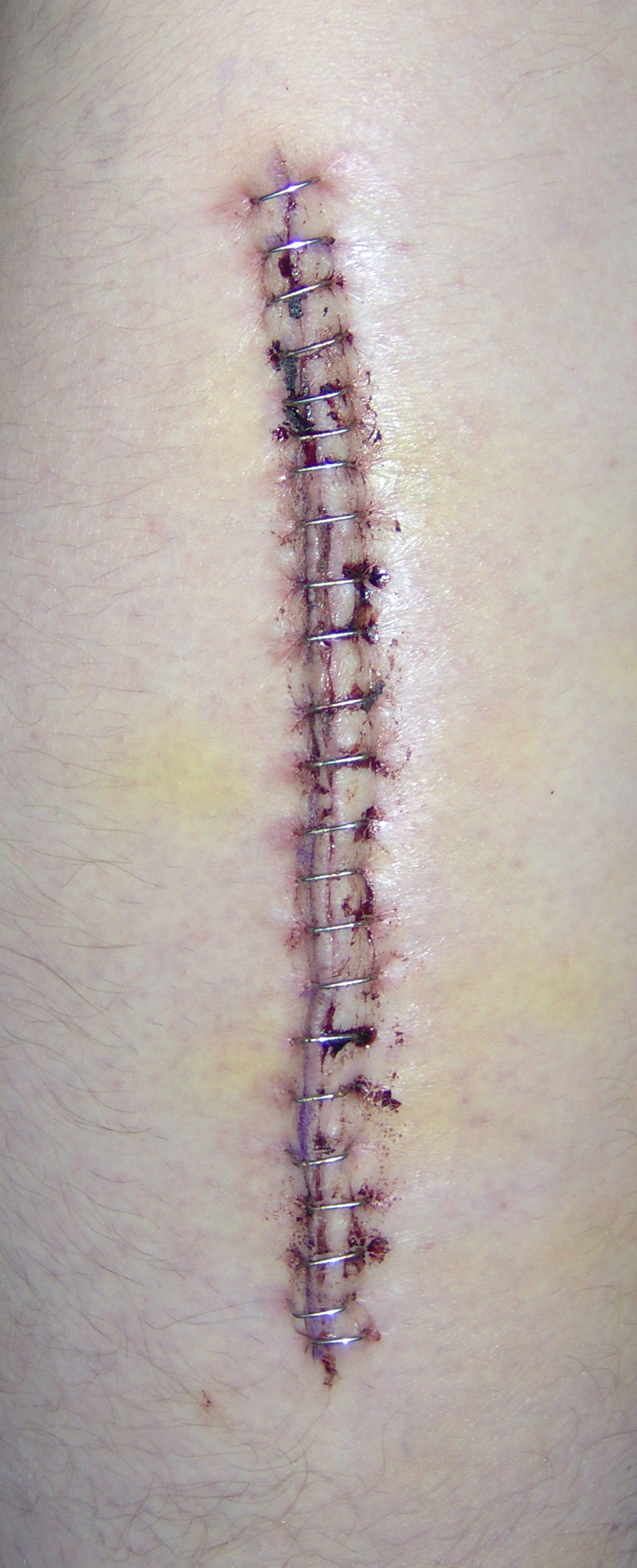
Surgical staples used on a hip

Surgical staples are used for the closing of incisions and wounds, a function also performed by sutures.

== See also ==
- Stapler
- Staple gun
- Staple remover
- Hammer tacker
- Paper clip
