= Staple gun =

Hand-held machine used to drive heavy metal staples

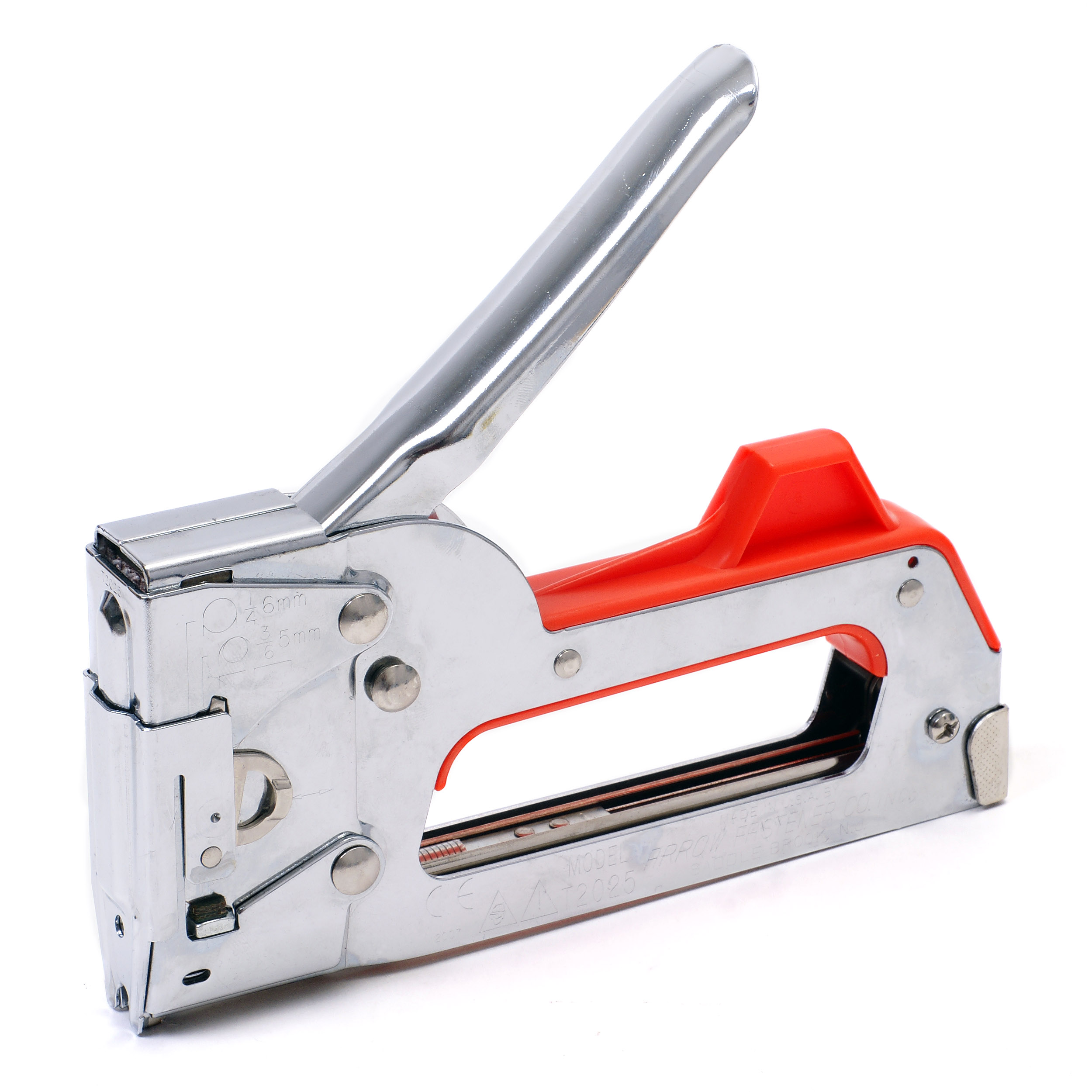
A manual staple gun

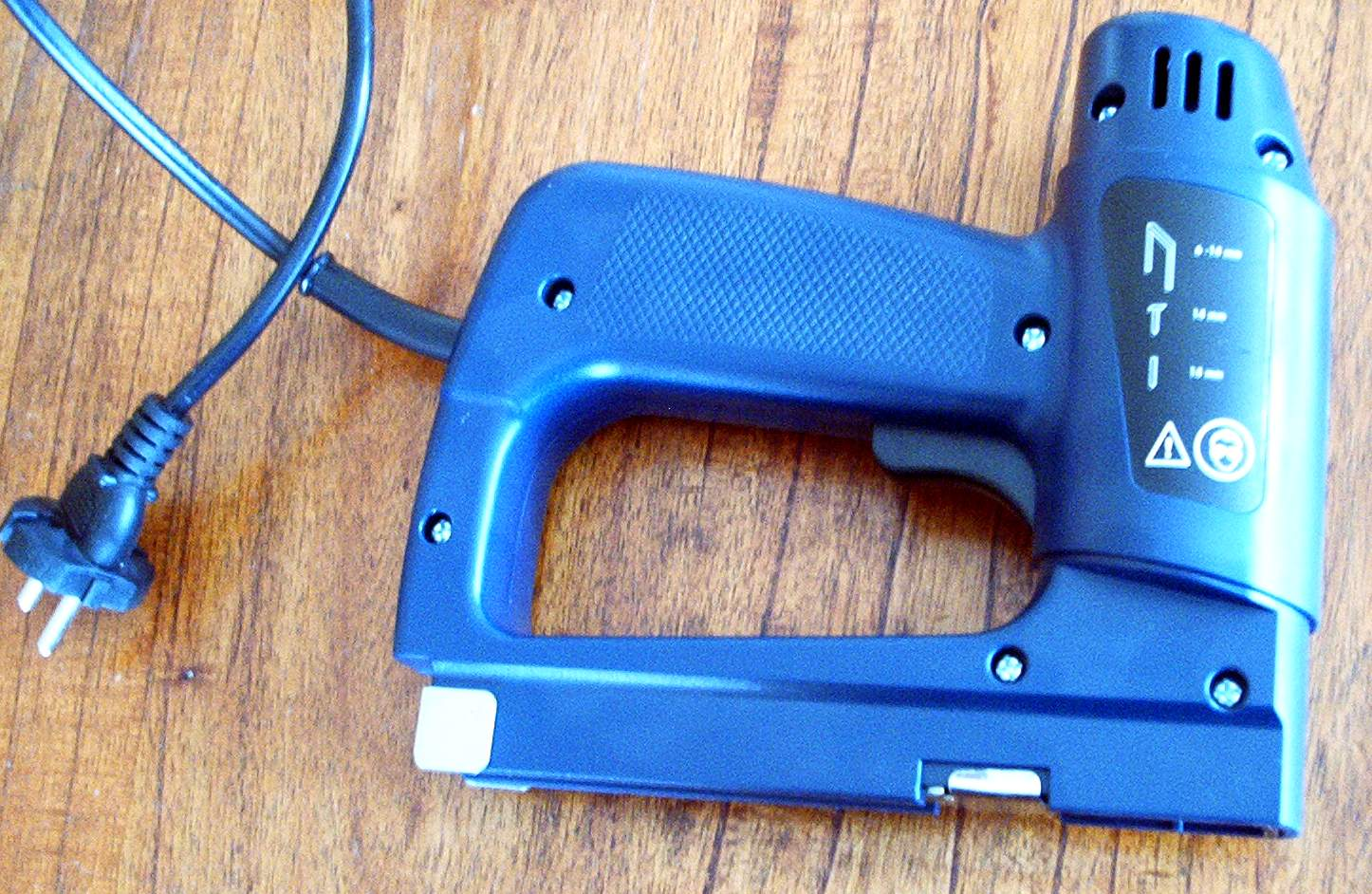
An electric stapler

A staple gun or powered stapler is a hand-held machine used to drive heavy metal staples into wood, plastic, or masonry. Staple guns are used for many different applications and to affix a variety of materials, including insulation, house wrap, roofing, wiring, carpeting, upholstery, and hobby and craft materials. These devices are also known as trigger tackers.

== Types ==
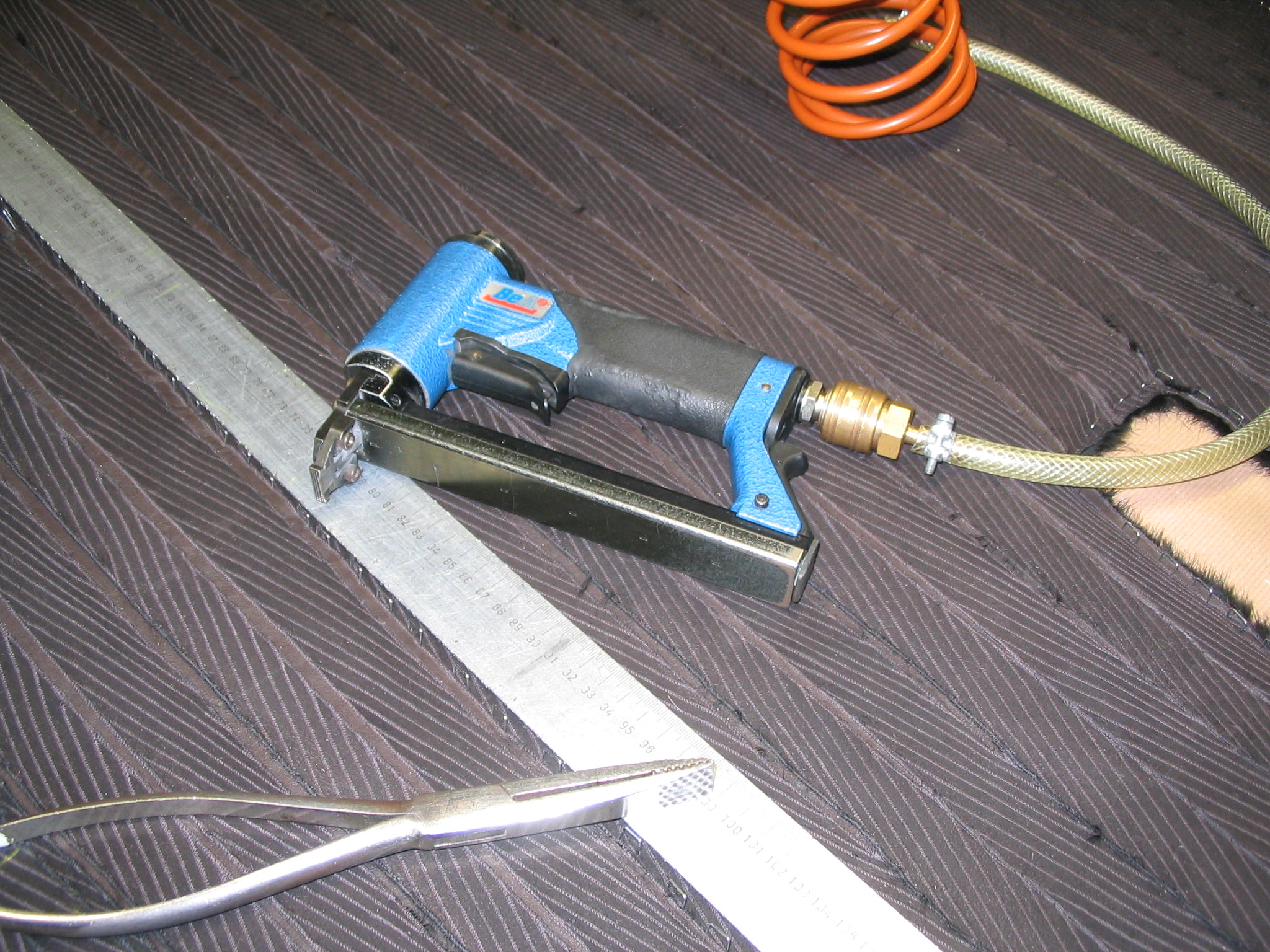
Pneumatic stapler

There are generally three different types of staple guns distinguished by the power source used to operate the gun: manual, electric (From a cord or battery), and pneumatic (Compressed air). Power staple guns can set staples at a somewhat quicker rate than hand-powered models, but their main advantage is that they can be used continuously for hours with comparatively little fatigue.

Some staple guns have a long nose that allows the staples to be applied into recessed corners. Another special feature may be wire guides for wiring to ensure that the staples will not pierce the wire. The "forward action" staple gun has a handle that points toward the trigger end, in the opposite direction of the traditional staple gun. These tools are easier to squeeze and better place pressure at the front of the tool where the staple is ejected. The first so called "forward action" staple gun was introduced about 1934.

A hammer tacker is a device somewhat similar to a staple gun, except that the mechanical energy from the user's muscles is stored—as with a hammer—as momentum of the gun itself, rather than as compression of an internal spring. This type of stapler is typically used for insulation, roofing and carpeting.

For most purposes square end staples are used; but some staplers can take rounded end staples for holding cables against a surface.

Typical staple leg lengths are 1/4″, 5/16″, 3/8″, 1/2″, 17/32″, and 9/16″, or 6, 8, 10, 12, and 14 millimetres.

== Comparison with office stapler ==
Unlike office staplers, some staple guns lack an anvil, the metal plate with curved slots that office staplers use to bend the legs of the staple inwards or outwards and flatten them against the paper.

Other staple guns have integral anvils. For example, a post stapler can be used to join the bottom flaps of a corrugated box but a blind clincher is used for closing the top of a closed box where post anvils are not possible. Anvils are built into the staple gun and penetrate the corrugated fiberboard: The staple hits the anvils and is crimped onto the box. The curved anvils are then removed.

Most staple guns, especially the hand-powered models, have a spring-like mechanism for storing mechanical energy and delivering it as a sharp and powerful blow. This mechanism is necessary because of the large force needed to drive the staples through solid wood or masonry, and because the staple must be completely inserted before the workpiece has time to move . In the office stapler, by contrast, the staple can be driven directly by the user's muscle power, at a relatively slow speed, because the paper is firmly supported by the anvil. In other words, the staple gun substitutes the workpiece's inertia for the missing anvil.

== See also ==
- Hammer tacker
- Nail gun
- Staple (fastener)
